This is a partial list of unnumbered minor planets for principal provisional designations assigned during 16–31 October 2001. , a total of 486 bodies remain unnumbered for this period. Objects for this year are listed on the following pages: A–E · Fi · Fii · G–O · P–R · S · T · U · V–W and X–Y. Also see previous and next year.

U 

|- id="2001 UM" bgcolor=#E9E9E9
| 0 || 2001 UM || MBA-M || 17.6 || 1.7 km || multiple || 2001–2020 || 21 Jan 2020 || 98 || align=left | Disc.: ADASAlt.: 2014 MB24 || 
|- id="2001 UO" bgcolor=#FFC2E0
| 9 || 2001 UO || APO || 24.1 || data-sort-value="0.054" | 54 m || single || 2 days || 18 Oct 2001 || 14 || align=left | Disc.: LPL/Spacewatch II || 
|- id="2001 UP" bgcolor=#FFC2E0
| 3 || 2001 UP || ATE || 25.7 || data-sort-value="0.026" | 26 m || single || 4 days || 20 Oct 2001 || 39 || align=left | Disc.: LINEAR || 
|- id="2001 UT" bgcolor=#FA8072
| 2 || 2001 UT || MCA || 18.5 || data-sort-value="0.59" | 590 m || multiple || 2001–2015 || 03 Dec 2015 || 109 || align=left | Disc.: LINEAR || 
|- id="2001 UU" bgcolor=#FA8072
| 1 || 2001 UU || MCA || 18.29 || data-sort-value="0.78" | 700 m || multiple || 2001–2023 || 19 Mar 20238 || 78 || align=left | Disc.: LINEAR || 
|- id="2001 UW" bgcolor=#FA8072
| 2 || 2001 UW || MCA || 18.95 || data-sort-value="0.48" | 480 m || multiple || 2001–2021 || 01 Nov 2021 || 35 || align=left | Disc.: LINEAR || 
|- id="2001 UB2" bgcolor=#FA8072
| 1 ||  || MCA || 18.2 || data-sort-value="0.96" | 960 m || multiple || 2001–2018 || 12 Jul 2018 || 171 || align=left | Disc.: LINEAR || 
|- id="2001 UW2" bgcolor=#FA8072
| – ||  || MCA || 20.5 || data-sort-value="0.24" | 240 m || single || 11 days || 25 Oct 2001 || 15 || align=left | Disc.: Spacewatch || 
|- id="2001 UB4" bgcolor=#FA8072
| 0 ||  || HUN || 18.64 || data-sort-value="0.56" | 560 m || multiple || 2001–2021 || 26 Nov 2021 || 77 || align=left | Disc.: LINEARAlt.: 2020 FP2 || 
|- id="2001 UR4" bgcolor=#E9E9E9
| 0 ||  || MBA-M || 17.25 || 2.0 km || multiple || 2001–2021 || 15 Apr 2021 || 164 || align=left | Disc.: Emerald Lane Obs.Alt.: 2014 QV139 || 
|- id="2001 UT4" bgcolor=#FA8072
| 1 ||  || MCA || 18.2 || data-sort-value="0.96" | 960 m || multiple || 2001–2019 || 15 Jan 2019 || 75 || align=left | Disc.: AMOS || 
|- id="2001 UX4" bgcolor=#FFC2E0
| 2 ||  || APO || 19.3 || data-sort-value="0.49" | 490 m || multiple || 2001–2021 || 03 Oct 2021 || 209 || align=left | Disc.: LINEAR || 
|- id="2001 UZ4" bgcolor=#FFC2E0
| 7 ||  || AMO || 20.6 || data-sort-value="0.27" | 270 m || single || 13 days || 21 Oct 2001 || 24 || align=left | Disc.: LINEAR || 
|- id="2001 UB5" bgcolor=#FFC2E0
| 9 ||  || AMO || 21.9 || data-sort-value="0.15" | 150 m || single || 3 days || 21 Oct 2001 || 18 || align=left | Disc.: LPL/Spacewatch II || 
|- id="2001 UC5" bgcolor=#FFC2E0
| 5 ||  || APO || 21.3 || data-sort-value="0.20" | 200 m || single || 6 days || 26 Oct 2001 || 70 || align=left | Disc.: LINEARAMO at MPC || 
|- id="2001 UD5" bgcolor=#FFC2E0
| 7 ||  || APO || 22.7 || data-sort-value="0.10" | 100 m || single || 23 days || 11 Nov 2001 || 31 || align=left | Disc.: NEAT || 
|- id="2001 UE5" bgcolor=#FFC2E0
| 0 ||  || AMO || 18.82 || data-sort-value="0.61" | 610 m || multiple || 2001–2021 || 28 Nov 2021 || 140 || align=left | Disc.: LINEAR || 
|- id="2001 UF5" bgcolor=#FFC2E0
| 4 ||  || APO || 22.7 || data-sort-value="0.10" | 100 m || single || 19 days || 26 Oct 2001 || 48 || align=left | Disc.: LINEAR || 
|- id="2001 UG7" bgcolor=#E9E9E9
| 0 ||  || MBA-M || 17.77 || 1.2 km || multiple || 2001–2021 || 14 Apr 2021 || 124 || align=left | Disc.: LINEARAlt.: 2014 XG36 || 
|- id="2001 US7" bgcolor=#d6d6d6
| 4 ||  || MBA-O || 16.5 || 2.8 km || multiple || 2001–2012 || 21 Oct 2012 || 42 || align=left | Disc.: LINEARAlt.: 2012 TO232 || 
|- id="2001 UA8" bgcolor=#E9E9E9
| 0 ||  || MBA-M || 17.8 || 1.5 km || multiple || 2001–2020 || 24 Jan 2020 || 136 || align=left | Disc.: LINEARAlt.: 2010 VE206, 2019 RE6 || 
|- id="2001 UB10" bgcolor=#FA8072
| 1 ||  || MCA || 17.9 || data-sort-value="0.78" | 780 m || multiple || 2001–2018 || 13 Nov 2018 || 39 || align=left | Disc.: LINEARAlt.: 2009 KR6 || 
|- id="2001 UK11" bgcolor=#fefefe
| 0 ||  || HUN || 18.69 || data-sort-value="0.54" | 540 m || multiple || 2001–2021 || 12 May 2021 || 80 || align=left | Disc.: LINEAR || 
|- id="2001 UM11" bgcolor=#FA8072
| 0 ||  || MCA || 16.7 || 1.9 km || multiple || 2001–2018 || 13 Dec 2018 || 112 || align=left | Disc.: LINEARAlt.: 2005 UC486 || 
|- id="2001 UN11" bgcolor=#fefefe
| 0 ||  || HUN || 17.9 || data-sort-value="0.78" | 780 m || multiple || 2000–2021 || 08 Jan 2021 || 201 || align=left | Disc.: LINEAR || 
|- id="2001 UN16" bgcolor=#FFC2E0
| 7 ||  || APO || 23.4 || data-sort-value="0.074" | 74 m || single || 31 days || 21 Nov 2001 || 17 || align=left | Disc.: LINEAR || 
|- id="2001 UO16" bgcolor=#FFE699
| 4 ||  || Asteroid || 17.7 || 1.6 km || single || 62 days || 14 Dec 2001 || 111 || align=left | Disc.: LINEARMCA at MPC || 
|- id="2001 UP16" bgcolor=#FFC2E0
| 2 ||  || AMO || 20.7 || data-sort-value="0.26" | 260 m || multiple || 2001–2012 || 13 Feb 2012 || 73 || align=left | Disc.: LINEAR || 
|- id="2001 UQ16" bgcolor=#FFC2E0
| 8 ||  || AMO || 21.3 || data-sort-value="0.20" | 200 m || single || 11 days || 26 Oct 2001 || 24 || align=left | Disc.: LINEAR || 
|- id="2001 UT16" bgcolor=#FFC2E0
| 7 ||  || AMO || 25.5 || data-sort-value="0.028" | 28 m || single || 1 day || 25 Oct 2001 || 9 || align=left | Disc.: LINEAR || 
|- id="2001 UU16" bgcolor=#FFC2E0
| 7 ||  || APO || 24.9 || data-sort-value="0.037" | 37 m || single || 2 days || 26 Oct 2001 || 24 || align=left | Disc.: SpacewatchAMO at MPC || 
|- id="2001 UA17" bgcolor=#C2E0FF
| 9 ||  || TNO || 7.07 || 164 km || single || 4 days || 21 Oct 2001 || 8 || align=left | Disc.: La Silla Obs.LoUTNOs, cubewano? || 
|- id="2001 UB17" bgcolor=#C2E0FF
| E ||  || TNO || 8.0 || 119 km || single || 1 day || 18 Oct 2001 || 6 || align=left | Disc.: La Silla Obs.LoUTNOs, plutino? || 
|- id="2001 UC17" bgcolor=#C2E0FF
| E ||  || TNO || 7.6 || 143 km || single || 1 day || 18 Oct 2001 || 5 || align=left | Disc.: La Silla Obs.LoUTNOs, plutino? || 
|- id="2001 UW17" bgcolor=#FFC2E0
| 2 ||  || AMO || 20.5 || data-sort-value="0.28" | 280 m || multiple || 2001–2014 || 23 Apr 2014 || 69 || align=left | Disc.: NEAT || 
|- id="2001 UX17" bgcolor=#FA8072
| 2 ||  || MCA || 17.8 || data-sort-value="0.82" | 820 m || multiple || 2001–2017 || 19 May 2017 || 34 || align=left | Disc.: NEAT || 
|- id="2001 UB18" bgcolor=#FA8072
| 0 ||  || MCA || 17.72 || 1.6 km || multiple || 1980–2022 || 03 Dec 2022 || 349 || align=left | Disc.: Palomar Obs.Alt.: 1980 WT2 || 
|- id="2001 UC18" bgcolor=#FA8072
| 0 ||  || MCA || 19.02 || data-sort-value="0.87" | 870 m || multiple || 2001–2020 || 28 Jan 2020 || 367 || align=left | Disc.: LINEAR || 
|- id="2001 UD18" bgcolor=#FFC2E0
| 7 ||  || APO || 27.6 || data-sort-value="0.011" | 11 m || single || 1 day || 27 Oct 2001 || 9 || align=left | Disc.: SpacewatchAMO at MPC || 
|- id="2001 UE18" bgcolor=#FFC2E0
| 8 ||  || AMO || 22.5 || data-sort-value="0.11" | 110 m || single || 3 days || 29 Oct 2001 || 15 || align=left | Disc.: NEAT || 
|- id="2001 UG18" bgcolor=#FFC2E0
| 0 ||  || AMO || 20.7 || data-sort-value="0.26" | 260 m || multiple || 2001–2016 || 06 Dec 2016 || 158 || align=left | Disc.: LINEAR || 
|- id="2001 UN18" bgcolor=#C2E0FF
| 3 ||  || TNO || 6.5 || 167 km || multiple || 2001–2013 || 06 Oct 2013 || 15 || align=left | Disc.: Kitt Peak Obs.LoUTNOs, cubewano (cold) || 
|- id="2001 UP18" bgcolor=#C2E0FF
| 3 ||  || TNO || 6.0 || 228 km || multiple || 2001–2019 || 27 Nov 2019 || 24 || align=left | Disc.: Kitt Peak Obs.LoUTNOs, twotino, BR-mag: 1.49; taxonomy: IR || 
|- id="2001 UT18" bgcolor=#E9E9E9
| 0 ||  || MBA-M || 17.9 || 1.1 km || multiple || 2001–2018 || 07 Aug 2018 || 77 || align=left | Disc.: NEATAlt.: 2014 UN187 || 
|- id="2001 UW18" bgcolor=#fefefe
| 0 ||  || MBA-I || 18.1 || data-sort-value="0.71" | 710 m || multiple || 2000–2019 || 24 Aug 2019 || 81 || align=left | Disc.: NEAT || 
|- id="2001 UA20" bgcolor=#E9E9E9
| 0 ||  || MBA-M || 16.92 || 1.2 km || multiple || 2001–2021 || 09 Aug 2021 || 131 || align=left | Disc.: NEAT || 
|- id="2001 UD20" bgcolor=#fefefe
| 0 ||  || MBA-I || 18.05 || data-sort-value="0.73" | 730 m || multiple || 2001–2021 || 05 Dec 2021 || 126 || align=left | Disc.: NEATAlt.: 2014 OT270 || 
|- id="2001 UP20" bgcolor=#fefefe
| 0 ||  || MBA-I || 17.4 || data-sort-value="0.98" | 980 m || multiple || 2001–2021 || 14 Jan 2021 || 129 || align=left | Disc.: NEAT || 
|- id="2001 UD25" bgcolor=#E9E9E9
| 1 ||  || MBA-M || 17.7 || 1.2 km || multiple || 2001–2020 || 14 Feb 2020 || 111 || align=left | Disc.: LINEAR || 
|- id="2001 UH25" bgcolor=#fefefe
| 0 ||  || MBA-I || 17.1 || 2.4 km || multiple || 2001–2021 || 10 Jan 2021 || 264 || align=left | Disc.: LINEAR || 
|- id="2001 UO27" bgcolor=#FFC2E0
| 6 ||  || AMO || 19.8 || data-sort-value="0.39" | 390 m || single || 16 days || 12 Nov 2001 || 21 || align=left | Disc.: LINEAR || 
|- id="2001 UW29" bgcolor=#E9E9E9
| 0 ||  || MBA-M || 17.31 || 1.5 km || multiple || 2001–2021 || 08 May 2021 || 186 || align=left | Disc.: LINEAR || 
|- id="2001 UE32" bgcolor=#E9E9E9
| – ||  || MBA-M || 17.1 || 1.6 km || single || 4 days || 20 Oct 2001 || 15 || align=left | Disc.: LINEAR || 
|- id="2001 UA38" bgcolor=#E9E9E9
| 1 ||  || MBA-M || 17.6 || data-sort-value="0.90" | 900 m || multiple || 2001–2021 || 07 Jun 2021 || 44 || align=left | Disc.: LINEAR || 
|- id="2001 UB38" bgcolor=#E9E9E9
| 1 ||  || MBA-M || 18.3 || data-sort-value="0.92" | 920 m || multiple || 2001–2019 || 07 Jan 2019 || 86 || align=left | Disc.: LINEARAlt.: 2015 BX554 || 
|- id="2001 UX39" bgcolor=#d6d6d6
| 0 ||  || MBA-O || 17.12 || 2.1 km || multiple || 2001–2020 || 27 Feb 2020 || 139 || align=left | Disc.: LINEAR || 
|- id="2001 UE40" bgcolor=#d6d6d6
| 1 ||  || MBA-O || 17.89 || 1.5 km || multiple || 2001-2022 || 26 Dec 2022 || 86 || align=left | Disc.: LINEARAlt.: 2022 SU224 || 
|- id="2001 UN41" bgcolor=#E9E9E9
| 1 ||  || MBA-M || 17.2 || 2.0 km || multiple || 2001–2019 || 21 Dec 2019 || 229 || align=left | Disc.: LINEAR || 
|- id="2001 UL42" bgcolor=#E9E9E9
| 2 ||  || MBA-M || 18.4 || data-sort-value="0.62" | 620 m || multiple || 2001–2017 || 07 Nov 2017 || 78 || align=left | Disc.: LINEAR || 
|- id="2001 UO42" bgcolor=#E9E9E9
| 0 ||  || MBA-M || 18.1 || 1.0 km || multiple || 2001–2018 || 13 Aug 2018 || 133 || align=left | Disc.: LINEARAlt.: 2014 TH82 || 
|- id="2001 UG43" bgcolor=#E9E9E9
| 2 ||  || MBA-M || 17.5 || 1.3 km || multiple || 2001–2019 || 08 Dec 2019 || 79 || align=left | Disc.: LINEARAlt.: 2014 TT31 || 
|- id="2001 UW55" bgcolor=#E9E9E9
| 0 ||  || MBA-M || 17.2 || 2.0 km || multiple || 2001–2019 || 22 Dec 2019 || 133 || align=left | Disc.: LINEARAlt.: 2010 RS10 || 
|- id="2001 UH56" bgcolor=#fefefe
| 0 ||  || MBA-I || 18.19 || data-sort-value="0.68" | 680 m || multiple || 2001–2021 || 01 May 2021 || 122 || align=left | Disc.: LINEARAlt.: 2015 VW46 || 
|- id="2001 US56" bgcolor=#fefefe
| 0 ||  || MBA-I || 17.9 || data-sort-value="0.78" | 780 m || multiple || 2001–2020 || 15 Dec 2020 || 147 || align=left | Disc.: LINEAR || 
|- id="2001 UJ58" bgcolor=#fefefe
| 2 ||  || MBA-I || 18.6 || data-sort-value="0.57" | 570 m || multiple || 2001–2012 || 17 Nov 2012 || 52 || align=left | Disc.: LINEARAlt.: 2012 SA2 || 
|- id="2001 UV60" bgcolor=#fefefe
| 0 ||  || MBA-I || 17.9 || data-sort-value="0.78" | 780 m || multiple || 2001–2017 || 27 Mar 2017 || 69 || align=left | Disc.: LINEAR || 
|- id="2001 US63" bgcolor=#E9E9E9
| 0 ||  || MBA-M || 16.9 || 1.8 km || multiple || 2001–2020 || 16 May 2020 || 162 || align=left | Disc.: LINEAR || 
|- id="2001 UW66" bgcolor=#fefefe
| 4 ||  || MBA-I || 19.0 || data-sort-value="0.47" | 470 m || multiple || 2001–2012 || 02 Nov 2012 || 34 || align=left | Disc.: LINEAR || 
|- id="2001 UY66" bgcolor=#E9E9E9
| 2 ||  || MBA-M || 17.8 || 1.2 km || multiple || 2001–2018 || 03 Oct 2018 || 47 || align=left | Disc.: LINEARAlt.: 2014 WS299 || 
|- id="2001 UA67" bgcolor=#fefefe
| 0 ||  || MBA-I || 18.4 || data-sort-value="0.62" | 620 m || multiple || 2001–2020 || 27 Apr 2020 || 90 || align=left | Disc.: LINEARAlt.: 2018 VV20 || 
|- id="2001 UN67" bgcolor=#C2FFFF
| 0 ||  || JT || 14.20 || 8.0 km || multiple || 2001–2021 || 30 Jun 2021 || 103 || align=left | Disc.: LINEARTrojan camp (L5) || 
|- id="2001 UW67" bgcolor=#fefefe
| 0 ||  || MBA-I || 17.9 || data-sort-value="0.78" | 780 m || multiple || 2001–2019 || 24 Nov 2019 || 115 || align=left | Disc.: LINEARAlt.: 2005 YQ201, 2015 PB259 || 
|- id="2001 UX67" bgcolor=#fefefe
| 0 ||  || MBA-I || 18.19 || data-sort-value="0.68" | 680 m || multiple || 2001–2021 || 08 Jun 2021 || 77 || align=left | Disc.: LINEARAlt.: 2017 FJ154 || 
|- id="2001 UN68" bgcolor=#d6d6d6
| 0 ||  || MBA-O || 16.62 || 2.6 km || multiple || 2001–2021 || 15 Jun 2021 || 135 || align=left | Disc.: LINEAR || 
|- id="2001 US68" bgcolor=#d6d6d6
| 0 ||  || MBA-O || 16.48 || 2.8 km || multiple || 1999–2021 || 03 May 2021 || 105 || align=left | Disc.: SpacewatchAlt.: 2010 LG102 || 
|- id="2001 UZ68" bgcolor=#E9E9E9
| 0 ||  || MBA-M || 17.7 || 1.6 km || multiple || 2001–2020 || 15 Dec 2020 || 110 || align=left | Disc.: SpacewatchAlt.: 2006 WF112 || 
|- id="2001 UB69" bgcolor=#fefefe
| 0 ||  || MBA-I || 18.8 || data-sort-value="0.52" | 520 m || multiple || 2001–2019 || 29 Sep 2019 || 129 || align=left | Disc.: SpacewatchAlt.: 2012 VM73 || 
|- id="2001 UL69" bgcolor=#fefefe
| 0 ||  || MBA-I || 18.81 || data-sort-value="0.51" | 510 m || multiple || 2001–2019 || 24 Oct 2019 || 49 || align=left | Disc.: LPL/Spacewatch II || 
|- id="2001 UM70" bgcolor=#fefefe
| 0 ||  || MBA-I || 18.99 || data-sort-value="0.47" | 470 m || multiple || 2001–2021 || 06 Nov 2021 || 56 || align=left | Disc.: LPL/Spacewatch II || 
|- id="2001 UO70" bgcolor=#d6d6d6
| 0 ||  || MBA-O || 17.45 || 1.8 km || multiple || 1996–2020 || 22 Apr 2020 || 58 || align=left | Disc.: LPL/Spacewatch II || 
|- id="2001 UP70" bgcolor=#E9E9E9
| 0 ||  || MBA-M || 17.46 || 1.4 km || multiple || 2001–2021 || 07 Apr 2021 || 108 || align=left | Disc.: LPL/Spacewatch IIAlt.: 2014 SN269 || 
|- id="2001 UQ70" bgcolor=#fefefe
| 0 ||  || MBA-I || 19.65 || data-sort-value="0.35" | 350 m || multiple || 2001–2020 || 22 Apr 2020 || 31 || align=left | Disc.: LPL/Spacewatch II || 
|- id="2001 US71" bgcolor=#E9E9E9
| 0 ||  || MBA-M || 17.30 || 1.5 km || multiple || 2001–2021 || 09 Apr 2021 || 105 || align=left | Disc.: SpacewatchAlt.: 2014 RR37 || 
|- id="2001 UT71" bgcolor=#d6d6d6
| 1 ||  || MBA-O || 18.21 || 1.3 km || multiple || 2001–2022 || 07 Jan 2022 || 54 || align=left | Disc.: SpacewatchAlt.: 2006 UE40 || 
|- id="2001 UW73" bgcolor=#fefefe
| 1 ||  || MBA-I || 17.3 || 1.0 km || multiple || 2001–2021 || 17 Jan 2021 || 124 || align=left | Disc.: LINEAR || 
|- id="2001 UK74" bgcolor=#fefefe
| 0 ||  || MBA-I || 17.77 || data-sort-value="0.83" | 830 m || multiple || 2001–2021 || 06 Apr 2021 || 201 || align=left | Disc.: LINEAR || 
|- id="2001 UB75" bgcolor=#E9E9E9
| 0 ||  || MBA-M || 17.55 || 1.3 km || multiple || 2001–2021 || 19 Apr 2021 || 105 || align=left | Disc.: LINEARAlt.: 2014 TW82 || 
|- id="2001 UE78" bgcolor=#E9E9E9
| 1 ||  || MBA-M || 17.93 || data-sort-value="0.77" | 770 m || multiple || 2001–2021 || 19 Apr 2021 || 45 || align=left | Disc.: LINEARAlt.: 2005 QL147 || 
|- id="2001 UK78" bgcolor=#E9E9E9
| 0 ||  || MBA-M || 17.8 || 1.5 km || multiple || 2001–2021 || 18 Jan 2021 || 79 || align=left | Disc.: LINEAR || 
|- id="2001 UN84" bgcolor=#fefefe
| 1 ||  || MBA-I || 18.6 || data-sort-value="0.57" | 570 m || multiple || 2001–2018 || 14 Dec 2018 || 95 || align=left | Disc.: LINEAR || 
|- id="2001 UX85" bgcolor=#fefefe
| 0 ||  || MBA-I || 18.5 || data-sort-value="0.59" | 590 m || multiple || 2001–2019 || 25 Nov 2019 || 59 || align=left | Disc.: SpacewatchAlt.: 2015 OM42 || 
|- id="2001 UO86" bgcolor=#fefefe
| 0 ||  || MBA-I || 18.76 || data-sort-value="0.53" | 530 m || multiple || 2001–2021 || 07 Apr 2021 || 82 || align=left | Disc.: LPL/Spacewatch IIAlt.: 2008 TY83 || 
|- id="2001 UW86" bgcolor=#E9E9E9
| 0 ||  || MBA-M || 17.6 || 1.7 km || multiple || 2001–2021 || 06 Jan 2021 || 56 || align=left | Disc.: Spacewatch || 
|- id="2001 UL87" bgcolor=#E9E9E9
| 0 ||  || MBA-M || 17.4 || 1.8 km || multiple || 2001–2021 || 18 Jan 2021 || 71 || align=left | Disc.: Spacewatch || 
|- id="2001 UX87" bgcolor=#fefefe
| 0 ||  || MBA-I || 18.1 || data-sort-value="0.71" | 710 m || multiple || 2001–2021 || 19 Mar 2021 || 84 || align=left | Disc.: SpacewatchAlt.: 2012 VN51, 2015 PT71 || 
|- id="2001 UY87" bgcolor=#E9E9E9
| – ||  || MBA-M || 18.5 || data-sort-value="0.84" | 840 m || single || 7 days || 25 Oct 2001 || 11 || align=left | Disc.: Spacewatch || 
|- id="2001 UF88" bgcolor=#E9E9E9
| 0 ||  || MBA-M || 17.1 || 2.1 km || multiple || 1999–2021 || 18 Jan 2021 || 109 || align=left | Disc.: Spacewatch || 
|- id="2001 UG88" bgcolor=#fefefe
| 0 ||  || MBA-I || 18.89 || data-sort-value="0.50" | 500 m || multiple || 2001–2021 || 09 May 2021 || 85 || align=left | Disc.: SpacewatchAlt.: 2008 SP257 || 
|- id="2001 UQ88" bgcolor=#E9E9E9
| 0 ||  || MBA-M || 17.2 || 2.0 km || multiple || 1996–2020 || 15 Dec 2020 || 104 || align=left | Disc.: SpacewatchAlt.: 2012 AH23 || 
|- id="2001 UV89" bgcolor=#fefefe
| 0 ||  || HUN || 18.8 || data-sort-value="0.52" | 520 m || multiple || 2001–2021 || 12 Jan 2021 || 70 || align=left | Disc.: SpacewatchAlt.: 2014 KX43 || 
|- id="2001 UA90" bgcolor=#fefefe
| 1 ||  || MBA-I || 18.9 || data-sort-value="0.49" | 490 m || multiple || 2001–2020 || 05 Dec 2020 || 43 || align=left | Disc.: SpacewatchAdded on 17 January 2021 || 
|- id="2001 UN90" bgcolor=#d6d6d6
| 0 ||  || MBA-O || 16.5 || 2.8 km || multiple || 2001–2020 || 25 May 2020 || 74 || align=left | Disc.: Spacewatch || 
|- id="2001 UQ90" bgcolor=#fefefe
| 0 ||  || MBA-I || 18.67 || data-sort-value="0.55" | 550 m || multiple || 2001–2021 || 14 Apr 2021 || 75 || align=left | Disc.: Spacewatch || 
|- id="2001 UW90" bgcolor=#E9E9E9
| 0 ||  || MBA-M || 17.60 || 1.3 km || multiple || 2001–2021 || 31 Mar 2021 || 118 || align=left | Disc.: SpacewatchAlt.: 2014 SF54 || 
|- id="2001 UX90" bgcolor=#E9E9E9
| 0 ||  || MBA-M || 16.91 || 1.7 km || multiple || 1999–2021 || 03 May 2021 || 178 || align=left | Disc.: SpacewatchAlt.: 2004 GA70, 2014 QW434 || 
|- id="2001 UF91" bgcolor=#E9E9E9
| 0 ||  || MBA-M || 18.1 || 1.0 km || multiple || 2001–2018 || 13 Aug 2018 || 96 || align=left | Disc.: SpacewatchAlt.: 2014 SP336 || 
|- id="2001 UU92" bgcolor=#FFC2E0
| 0 ||  || AMO || 20.1 || data-sort-value="0.34" | 340 m || multiple || 2001–2019 || 05 Jan 2019 || 168 || align=left | Disc.: NEAT || 
|- id="2001 UX93" bgcolor=#d6d6d6
| 0 ||  || MBA-O || 17.22 || 2.0 km || multiple || 2001–2022 || 26 Jan 2022 || 125 || align=left | Disc.: AMOS || 
|- id="2001 UF94" bgcolor=#FA8072
| 0 ||  || MCA || 18.1 || data-sort-value="0.71" | 710 m || multiple || 2001–2019 || 24 Dec 2019 || 90 || align=left | Disc.: AMOS || 
|- id="2001 UN95" bgcolor=#fefefe
| 0 ||  || MBA-I || 17.5 || data-sort-value="0.94" | 940 m || multiple || 2001–2019 || 26 Nov 2019 || 150 || align=left | Disc.: NEATAlt.: 2015 KF123 || 
|- id="2001 UP95" bgcolor=#E9E9E9
| 1 ||  || MBA-M || 18.0 || 1.1 km || multiple || 2001–2020 || 02 Feb 2020 || 93 || align=left | Disc.: NEAT || 
|- id="2001 UB96" bgcolor=#d6d6d6
| 0 ||  || MBA-O || 16.71 || 2.5 km || multiple || 2001–2021 || 08 May 2021 || 103 || align=left | Disc.: LINEARAlt.: 2018 TW7 || 
|- id="2001 UA97" bgcolor=#fefefe
| 0 ||  || MBA-I || 17.1 || 1.1 km || multiple || 2001–2021 || 09 Jan 2021 || 205 || align=left | Disc.: LINEAR || 
|- id="2001 UB97" bgcolor=#E9E9E9
| 1 ||  || MBA-M || 17.9 || 1.1 km || multiple || 2001–2018 || 10 Jul 2018 || 118 || align=left | Disc.: LINEARAlt.: 2014 SD148 || 
|- id="2001 UO100" bgcolor=#E9E9E9
| 0 ||  || MBA-M || 17.7 || 1.2 km || multiple || 2001–2020 || 27 Feb 2020 || 115 || align=left | Disc.: LINEARAlt.: 2014 US51 || 
|- id="2001 UA101" bgcolor=#d6d6d6
| 0 ||  || MBA-O || 16.46 || 2.8 km || multiple || 2001–2021 || 08 Jun 2021 || 92 || align=left | Disc.: LINEAR || 
|- id="2001 UC101" bgcolor=#FA8072
| 1 ||  || MCA || 19.2 || data-sort-value="0.43" | 430 m || multiple || 2001–2017 || 20 Aug 2017 || 41 || align=left | Disc.: LINEAR || 
|- id="2001 UU101" bgcolor=#E9E9E9
| 0 ||  || MBA-M || 17.3 || 1.9 km || multiple || 2001–2021 || 04 Jan 2021 || 142 || align=left | Disc.: LINEARAlt.: 2015 TG77 || 
|- id="2001 UF102" bgcolor=#fefefe
| 0 ||  || MBA-I || 17.83 || data-sort-value="0.81" | 810 m || multiple || 2001–2021 || 08 Apr 2021 || 167 || align=left | Disc.: LINEARAlt.: 2003 GP52, 2014 HO55, 2015 PW104 || 
|- id="2001 UG102" bgcolor=#E9E9E9
| 0 ||  || MBA-M || 17.31 || 1.5 km || multiple || 2001–2021 || 13 May 2021 || 135 || align=left | Disc.: LINEARAlt.: 2014 WO103 || 
|- id="2001 UQ102" bgcolor=#fefefe
| 1 ||  || MBA-I || 17.6 || data-sort-value="0.90" | 900 m || multiple || 2001–2021 || 17 Jan 2021 || 108 || align=left | Disc.: LINEAR || 
|- id="2001 UW102" bgcolor=#fefefe
| 1 ||  || MBA-I || 18.8 || data-sort-value="0.52" | 520 m || multiple || 2001–2018 || 03 Nov 2018 || 60 || align=left | Disc.: LINEAR || 
|- id="2001 UO103" bgcolor=#d6d6d6
| 0 ||  || MBA-O || 16.53 || 2.8 km || multiple || 2001–2021 || 30 Jun 2021 || 139 || align=left | Disc.: LINEARAlt.: 2012 TS53, 2012 VJ20, 2014 BB64 || 
|- id="2001 UQ103" bgcolor=#E9E9E9
| 0 ||  || MBA-M || 17.47 || 1.8 km || multiple || 2001–2021 || 15 Apr 2021 || 112 || align=left | Disc.: LINEARAlt.: 2010 VV107 || 
|- id="2001 UC104" bgcolor=#fefefe
| 1 ||  || MBA-I || 18.8 || data-sort-value="0.52" | 520 m || multiple || 2001–2018 || 12 Jul 2018 || 50 || align=left | Disc.: LINEARAlt.: 2008 SJ181 || 
|- id="2001 UJ104" bgcolor=#fefefe
| 0 ||  || MBA-I || 18.6 || data-sort-value="0.57" | 570 m || multiple || 1994–2018 || 15 Sep 2018 || 59 || align=left | Disc.: LINEAR || 
|- id="2001 UM104" bgcolor=#E9E9E9
| 0 ||  || MBA-M || 16.8 || 2.4 km || multiple || 2001–2021 || 17 Jan 2021 || 110 || align=left | Disc.: LINEAR || 
|- id="2001 UN104" bgcolor=#E9E9E9
| – ||  || MBA-M || 17.4 || data-sort-value="0.98" | 980 m || single || 8 days || 25 Oct 2001 || 20 || align=left | Disc.: LINEAR || 
|- id="2001 UX104" bgcolor=#fefefe
| 1 ||  || MBA-I || 18.1 || data-sort-value="0.71" | 710 m || multiple || 2001–2019 || 22 Aug 2019 || 93 || align=left | Disc.: LINEARAlt.: 2012 TO193 || 
|- id="2001 UK105" bgcolor=#d6d6d6
| 0 ||  || MBA-O || 16.31 || 3.0 km || multiple || 2001–2021 || 10 Apr 2021 || 139 || align=left | Disc.: LINEARAlt.: 2012 QX49 || 
|- id="2001 UU105" bgcolor=#fefefe
| 0 ||  || MBA-I || 18.1 || data-sort-value="0.71" | 710 m || multiple || 2001–2019 || 05 Aug 2019 || 65 || align=left | Disc.: LINEARAlt.: 2014 EF147 || 
|- id="2001 UN107" bgcolor=#E9E9E9
| 0 ||  || MBA-M || 17.5 || 1.3 km || multiple || 2001–2020 || 02 Feb 2020 || 172 || align=left | Disc.: LINEAR || 
|- id="2001 UM110" bgcolor=#fefefe
| 0 ||  || MBA-I || 18.47 || data-sort-value="0.60" | 600 m || multiple || 2001–2021 || 12 Aug 2021 || 94 || align=left | Disc.: LINEARAlt.: 2018 VX25 || 
|- id="2001 UT110" bgcolor=#E9E9E9
| 2 ||  || MBA-M || 17.3 || 1.5 km || multiple || 2001–2019 || 28 Dec 2019 || 69 || align=left | Disc.: LINEARAlt.: 2014 QO551, 2014 SO283 || 
|- id="2001 UD111" bgcolor=#d6d6d6
| 0 ||  || MBA-O || 17.26 || 2.0 km || multiple || 2001–2021 || 08 Sep 2021 || 55 || align=left | Disc.: LINEARAdded on 30 September 2021 || 
|- id="2001 UO111" bgcolor=#E9E9E9
| 0 ||  || MBA-M || 18.1 || 1.0 km || multiple || 2001–2018 || 02 Nov 2018 || 47 || align=left | Disc.: LINEARAlt.: 2018 UB10 || 
|- id="2001 UK114" bgcolor=#E9E9E9
| 0 ||  || MBA-M || 17.9 || data-sort-value="0.78" | 780 m || multiple || 2001–2020 || 27 Apr 2020 || 48 || align=left | Disc.: LINEAR || 
|- id="2001 UQ115" bgcolor=#E9E9E9
| 0 ||  || MBA-M || 17.6 || 1.3 km || multiple || 2001–2018 || 30 Sep 2018 || 92 || align=left | Disc.: LINEARAlt.: 2014 US94 || 
|- id="2001 UC119" bgcolor=#FA8072
| 2 ||  || MCA || 17.8 || data-sort-value="0.82" | 820 m || multiple || 2001–2019 || 28 Mar 2019 || 63 || align=left | Disc.: LINEAR || 
|- id="2001 UG124" bgcolor=#E9E9E9
| 3 ||  || MBA-M || 18.0 || 1.4 km || multiple || 2001–2019 || 23 Aug 2019 || 28 || align=left | Disc.: NEAT || 
|- id="2001 UO124" bgcolor=#E9E9E9
| 0 ||  || MBA-M || 16.56 || 2.0 km || multiple || 2001–2021 || 02 Apr 2021 || 189 || align=left | Disc.: NEAT || 
|- id="2001 UP126" bgcolor=#E9E9E9
| – ||  || MBA-M || 17.7 || 1.2 km || single || 18 days || 25 Oct 2001 || 15 || align=left | Disc.: LINEAR || 
|- id="2001 UE129" bgcolor=#fefefe
| 1 ||  || MBA-I || 18.2 || data-sort-value="0.68" | 680 m || multiple || 2001–2020 || 19 Jan 2020 || 94 || align=left | Disc.: LINEAR || 
|- id="2001 UO129" bgcolor=#d6d6d6
| 0 ||  || MBA-O || 15.8 || 3.9 km || multiple || 2001–2020 || 21 May 2020 || 135 || align=left | Disc.: LINEARAlt.: 2012 TV216 || 
|- id="2001 US129" bgcolor=#fefefe
| 1 ||  || MBA-I || 18.6 || data-sort-value="0.57" | 570 m || multiple || 2001–2020 || 22 Jan 2020 || 91 || align=left | Disc.: LINEARAlt.: 2008 RP147 || 
|- id="2001 UU129" bgcolor=#fefefe
| 0 ||  || MBA-I || 18.3 || data-sort-value="0.65" | 650 m || multiple || 2001–2020 || 08 Dec 2020 || 151 || align=left | Disc.: LINEAR || 
|- id="2001 UG131" bgcolor=#E9E9E9
| 0 ||  || MBA-M || 17.9 || 1.5 km || multiple || 2001–2019 || 19 Dec 2019 || 77 || align=left | Disc.: LINEARAlt.: 2010 UY54 || 
|- id="2001 UX131" bgcolor=#FA8072
| 2 ||  || MCA || 18.5 || data-sort-value="0.59" | 590 m || multiple || 2001–2012 || 05 Dec 2012 || 35 || align=left | Disc.: LINEARAlt.: 2012 TS302 || 
|- id="2001 UC133" bgcolor=#E9E9E9
| 1 ||  || MBA-M || 18.2 || data-sort-value="0.96" | 960 m || multiple || 2001–2018 || 13 Nov 2018 || 71 || align=left | Disc.: LINEARAlt.: 2014 WO391 || 
|- id="2001 UL133" bgcolor=#d6d6d6
| 0 ||  || MBA-O || 15.80 || 3.9 km || multiple || 2001–2021 || 11 Jun 2021 || 241 || align=left | Disc.: LINEARAlt.: 2017 OL30 || 
|- id="2001 UD135" bgcolor=#fefefe
| 0 ||  || MBA-I || 18.47 || data-sort-value="0.60" | 600 m || multiple || 2001–2021 || 10 Sep 2021 || 160 || align=left | Disc.: LINEAR || 
|- id="2001 UT137" bgcolor=#d6d6d6
| 0 ||  || MBA-O || 17.17 || 2.0 km || multiple || 2001–2021 || 30 May 2021 || 92 || align=left | Disc.: LINEARAlt.: 2001 SH234 || 
|- id="2001 UD138" bgcolor=#fefefe
| 0 ||  || MBA-I || 17.8 || data-sort-value="0.82" | 820 m || multiple || 2001–2020 || 24 Oct 2020 || 126 || align=left | Disc.: LINEARAlt.: 2013 YB84 || 
|- id="2001 UL138" bgcolor=#C2FFFF
| 0 ||  || JT || 13.8 || 9.7 km || multiple || 2001–2020 || 14 Jun 2020 || 96 || align=left | Disc.: LINEARTrojan camp (L5)Alt.: 2012 TE332 || 
|- id="2001 UW138" bgcolor=#d6d6d6
| 0 ||  || MBA-O || 17.2 || 2.0 km || multiple || 2001–2018 || 13 Mar 2018 || 55 || align=left | Disc.: LINEAR || 
|- id="2001 UH139" bgcolor=#fefefe
| 0 ||  || MBA-I || 17.9 || data-sort-value="0.78" | 780 m || multiple || 2001–2021 || 04 Jan 2021 || 82 || align=left | Disc.: LINEAR || 
|- id="2001 UT140" bgcolor=#E9E9E9
| 1 ||  || MBA-M || 17.7 || 1.2 km || multiple || 2001–2019 || 21 Dec 2019 || 65 || align=left | Disc.: LINEARAlt.: 2014 SA289, 2016 CQ128 || 
|- id="2001 UX140" bgcolor=#E9E9E9
| – ||  || MBA-M || 18.3 || data-sort-value="0.65" | 650 m || single || 10 days || 26 Oct 2001 || 16 || align=left | Disc.: LINEAR || 
|- id="2001 UZ141" bgcolor=#fefefe
| 0 ||  || MBA-I || 18.2 || data-sort-value="0.68" | 680 m || multiple || 2001–2018 || 03 Oct 2018 || 82 || align=left | Disc.: LINEARAlt.: 2008 UO343 || 
|- id="2001 UQ142" bgcolor=#fefefe
| 1 ||  || MBA-I || 18.0 || data-sort-value="0.75" | 750 m || multiple || 2001–2021 || 17 Jan 2021 || 107 || align=left | Disc.: LINEAR || 
|- id="2001 UB143" bgcolor=#FA8072
| 1 ||  || MCA || 18.6 || data-sort-value="0.57" | 570 m || multiple || 2001–2015 || 31 Dec 2015 || 111 || align=left | Disc.: LINEARAlt.: 2008 SS245 || 
|- id="2001 UO143" bgcolor=#E9E9E9
| 1 ||  || MBA-M || 16.6 || 2.7 km || multiple || 2001–2021 || 04 Jan 2021 || 117 || align=left | Disc.: LINEARAlt.: 2015 TA166 || 
|- id="2001 UU146" bgcolor=#E9E9E9
| 1 ||  || MBA-M || 17.9 || 1.1 km || multiple || 2001–2020 || 22 Apr 2020 || 80 || align=left | Disc.: LINEAR || 
|- id="2001 UY146" bgcolor=#fefefe
| 0 ||  || MBA-I || 18.3 || data-sort-value="0.65" | 650 m || multiple || 2001–2019 || 28 Nov 2019 || 71 || align=left | Disc.: LINEAR || 
|- id="2001 UE147" bgcolor=#E9E9E9
| – ||  || MBA-M || 18.0 || data-sort-value="0.75" | 750 m || single || 41 days || 21 Nov 2001 || 16 || align=left | Disc.: LINEAR || 
|- id="2001 UF147" bgcolor=#E9E9E9
| 0 ||  || MBA-M || 17.4 || 1.8 km || multiple || 2001–2019 || 28 Nov 2019 || 87 || align=left | Disc.: LINEARAlt.: 2010 NZ54 || 
|- id="2001 UO147" bgcolor=#d6d6d6
| E ||  || MBA-O || 16.1 || 3.4 km || single || 6 days || 24 Oct 2001 || 11 || align=left | Disc.: LINEAR || 
|- id="2001 UP147" bgcolor=#fefefe
| 0 ||  || MBA-I || 18.69 || data-sort-value="0.54" | 540 m || multiple || 2001–2022 || 27 Jan 2022 || 102 || align=left | Disc.: LINEARAlt.: 2014 SK337 || 
|- id="2001 UK148" bgcolor=#d6d6d6
| 2 ||  || MBA-O || 17.3 || 1.9 km || multiple || 2001–2017 || 16 Dec 2017 || 107 || align=left | Disc.: LINEARAlt.: 2012 WU23 || 
|- id="2001 UU150" bgcolor=#E9E9E9
| 0 ||  || MBA-M || 16.91 || 1.7 km || multiple || 2001–2021 || 12 May 2021 || 115 || align=left | Disc.: LINEAR || 
|- id="2001 UG156" bgcolor=#E9E9E9
| 0 ||  || MBA-M || 17.87 || 1.1 km || multiple || 2001–2021 || 17 May 2021 || 183 || align=left | Disc.: LINEAR || 
|- id="2001 UQ163" bgcolor=#FFC2E0
| 2 ||  || AMO || 20.9 || data-sort-value="0.23" | 230 m || multiple || 2001–2017 || 13 Nov 2017 || 83 || align=left | Disc.: Spacewatch || 
|- id="2001 UP164" bgcolor=#fefefe
| 0 ||  || MBA-I || 18.19 || data-sort-value="0.68" | 680 m || multiple || 2001–2021 || 03 Dec 2021 || 198 || align=left | Disc.: NEAT || 
|- id="2001 UD166" bgcolor=#E9E9E9
| 0 ||  || MBA-M || 18.0 || 1.1 km || multiple || 2001–2020 || 26 Jan 2020 || 91 || align=left | Disc.: SpacewatchAlt.: 2014 TS58 || 
|- id="2001 UG166" bgcolor=#d6d6d6
| 0 ||  || MBA-O || 16.33 || 3.0 km || multiple || 2001–2021 || 08 May 2021 || 157 || align=left | Disc.: SpacewatchAlt.: 2012 SO26 || 
|- id="2001 UQ166" bgcolor=#d6d6d6
| 1 ||  || MBA-O || 16.5 || 2.8 km || multiple || 2001–2018 || 16 Sep 2018 || 42 || align=left | Disc.: LPL/Spacewatch II || 
|- id="2001 UN171" bgcolor=#E9E9E9
| 0 ||  || MBA-M || 17.50 || data-sort-value="0.94" | 940 m || multiple || 2001–2021 || 17 Jul 2021 || 56 || align=left | Disc.: LINEAR || 
|- id="2001 UW171" bgcolor=#fefefe
| 0 ||  || MBA-I || 18.0 || data-sort-value="0.75" | 750 m || multiple || 2001–2021 || 17 Jan 2021 || 93 || align=left | Disc.: NEAT || 
|- id="2001 UX172" bgcolor=#FA8072
| 1 ||  || MCA || 19.10 || data-sort-value="0.64" | 640 m || multiple || 2001–2019 || 02 Jan 2019 || 55 || align=left | Disc.: NEAT || 
|- id="2001 UU173" bgcolor=#d6d6d6
| 0 ||  || MBA-O || 16.32 || 3.0 km || multiple || 2001–2021 || 14 Apr 2021 || 136 || align=left | Disc.: NEATAlt.: 2012 RD30 || 
|- id="2001 UF176" bgcolor=#d6d6d6
| 0 ||  || MBA-O || 17.8 || 1.5 km || multiple || 2001–2017 || 24 Nov 2017 || 44 || align=left | Disc.: LPL/Spacewatch II || 
|- id="2001 UN176" bgcolor=#fefefe
| 0 ||  || MBA-I || 18.9 || data-sort-value="0.49" | 490 m || multiple || 2001–2020 || 23 Sep 2020 || 92 || align=left | Disc.: SpacewatchAlt.: 2004 RY270, 2010 JV172, 2013 GU61 || 
|- id="2001 UZ176" bgcolor=#E9E9E9
| 0 ||  || MBA-M || 18.3 || data-sort-value="0.92" | 920 m || multiple || 2001–2018 || 10 Nov 2018 || 95 || align=left | Disc.: LINEAR || 
|- id="2001 UC178" bgcolor=#fefefe
| 0 ||  || MBA-I || 17.3 || 1.0 km || multiple || 1997–2021 || 08 Jan 2021 || 157 || align=left | Disc.: LINEARAlt.: 2012 SU58 || 
|- id="2001 UZ178" bgcolor=#E9E9E9
| 0 ||  || MBA-M || 17.54 || data-sort-value="0.92" | 920 m || multiple || 2001–2021 || 28 Aug 2021 || 69 || align=left | Disc.: NEAT || 
|- id="2001 UH182" bgcolor=#E9E9E9
| 2 ||  || MBA-M || 17.1 || 1.6 km || multiple || 2001–2014 || 21 Nov 2014 || 62 || align=left | Disc.: NEAT || 
|- id="2001 UG183" bgcolor=#E9E9E9
| 0 ||  || MBA-M || 17.07 || 2.1 km || multiple || 2001–2021 || 14 Apr 2021 || 146 || align=left | Disc.: LPL/Spacewatch IIAlt.: 2010 TS182 || 
|- id="2001 UJ185" bgcolor=#d6d6d6
| 0 ||  || MBA-O || 16.06 || 3.4 km || multiple || 2001–2021 || 27 Nov 2021 || 211 || align=left | Disc.: NEAT || 
|- id="2001 UO186" bgcolor=#fefefe
| 0 ||  || MBA-I || 18.99 || data-sort-value="0.47" | 470 m || multiple || 2001–2021 || 29 Oct 2021 || 95 || align=left | Disc.: LPL/Spacewatch IIAlt.: 2011 SP135 || 
|- id="2001 UT187" bgcolor=#d6d6d6
| 0 ||  || MBA-O || 16.16 || 3.3 km || multiple || 2001–2021 || 08 Jun 2021 || 209 || align=left | Disc.: NEATAlt.: 2015 HX177 || 
|- id="2001 UW189" bgcolor=#E9E9E9
| 0 ||  || MBA-M || 17.22 || 1.5 km || multiple || 2001–2021 || 30 Jul 2021 || 226 || align=left | Disc.: NEATAlt.: 2001 SA311 || 
|- id="2001 UM190" bgcolor=#d6d6d6
| 0 ||  || MBA-O || 16.88 || 2.3 km || multiple || 2001–2021 || 09 Aug 2021 || 63 || align=left | Disc.: NEATAlt.: 2014 EH21 || 
|- id="2001 UQ190" bgcolor=#fefefe
| 1 ||  || MBA-I || 18.5 || data-sort-value="0.59" | 590 m || multiple || 2001–2020 || 27 Jan 2020 || 150 || align=left | Disc.: NEATAlt.: 2008 TM3 || 
|- id="2001 UU190" bgcolor=#E9E9E9
| 0 ||  || MBA-M || 17.77 || 1.2 km || multiple || 2001–2021 || 31 May 2021 || 107 || align=left | Disc.: LPL/Spacewatch IIAlt.: 2014 WA214 || 
|- id="2001 UP191" bgcolor=#E9E9E9
| 0 ||  || MBA-M || 16.8 || 2.4 km || multiple || 2001–2019 || 01 Nov 2019 || 80 || align=left | Disc.: LPL/Spacewatch IIAlt.: 2015 TW70 || 
|- id="2001 UR191" bgcolor=#E9E9E9
| 1 ||  || MBA-M || 17.3 || 1.0 km || multiple || 1997–2017 || 22 Jun 2017 || 49 || align=left | Disc.: NEAT || 
|- id="2001 UZ191" bgcolor=#d6d6d6
| 0 ||  || MBA-O || 15.84 || 3.8 km || multiple || 2001–2021 || 13 Apr 2021 || 158 || align=left | Disc.: LINEAR || 
|- id="2001 US193" bgcolor=#d6d6d6
| 0 ||  || MBA-O || 16.05 || 3.4 km || multiple || 2001–2021 || 09 Jun 2021 || 159 || align=left | Disc.: NEATAlt.: 2012 SD55 || 
|- id="2001 UV193" bgcolor=#d6d6d6
| 4 ||  || MBA-O || 17.1 || 2.1 km || multiple || 2001–2013 || 20 Jan 2013 || 25 || align=left | Disc.: NEAT || 
|- id="2001 UL194" bgcolor=#E9E9E9
| 1 ||  || MBA-M || 18.54 || data-sort-value="0.58" | 580 m || multiple || 2001–2021 || 10 Sep 2021 || 66 || align=left | Disc.: NEATAlt.: 2005 TO89, 2005 TQ220, 2013 QA56 || 
|- id="2001 UN194" bgcolor=#fefefe
| 0 ||  || MBA-I || 18.7 || data-sort-value="0.54" | 540 m || multiple || 2001–2019 || 27 Nov 2019 || 58 || align=left | Disc.: NEAT || 
|- id="2001 US194" bgcolor=#E9E9E9
| 0 ||  || MBA-M || 16.99 || 1.7 km || multiple || 2000–2021 || 30 Jul 2021 || 220 || align=left | Disc.: NEATAlt.: 2010 XM8 || 
|- id="2001 UV194" bgcolor=#E9E9E9
| 0 ||  || MBA-M || 18.14 || data-sort-value="0.99" | 990 m || multiple || 2001–2021 || 08 May 2021 || 75 || align=left | Disc.: NEAT || 
|- id="2001 UA195" bgcolor=#fefefe
| 0 ||  || MBA-I || 18.2 || data-sort-value="0.68" | 680 m || multiple || 2001–2021 || 18 Jan 2021 || 84 || align=left | Disc.: NEAT || 
|- id="2001 UE195" bgcolor=#E9E9E9
| 2 ||  || MBA-M || 17.8 || data-sort-value="0.82" | 820 m || multiple || 2001–2021 || 08 Jun 2021 || 35 || align=left | Disc.: NEAT || 
|- id="2001 UL195" bgcolor=#fefefe
| 0 ||  || MBA-I || 18.0 || data-sort-value="0.75" | 750 m || multiple || 2001–2020 || 22 Mar 2020 || 122 || align=left | Disc.: NEAT || 
|- id="2001 UV195" bgcolor=#d6d6d6
| 0 ||  || MBA-O || 16.48 || 2.8 km || multiple || 2001–2021 || 08 Aug 2021 || 102 || align=left | Disc.: NEATAlt.: 2014 JC18 || 
|- id="2001 UC196" bgcolor=#fefefe
| 1 ||  || MBA-I || 18.2 || data-sort-value="0.68" | 680 m || multiple || 2001–2019 || 25 Sep 2019 || 55 || align=left | Disc.: NEATAlt.: 2012 UF74 || 
|- id="2001 UG196" bgcolor=#E9E9E9
| 0 ||  || MBA-M || 17.2 || 1.5 km || multiple || 2001–2020 || 18 Apr 2020 || 215 || align=left | Disc.: NEAT || 
|- id="2001 UQ196" bgcolor=#fefefe
| 0 ||  || HUN || 18.12 || data-sort-value="0.71" | 710 m || multiple || 2001–2021 || 16 May 2021 || 128 || align=left | Disc.: NEAT || 
|- id="2001 US196" bgcolor=#d6d6d6
| 0 ||  || MBA-O || 16.7 || 2.5 km || multiple || 2001–2020 || 26 Jan 2020 || 99 || align=left | Disc.: George Obs. || 
|- id="2001 UG197" bgcolor=#FA8072
| 0 ||  || MCA || 17.76 || data-sort-value="0.83" | 830 m || multiple || 2001–2021 || 06 Dec 2021 || 206 || align=left | Disc.: LONEOS || 
|- id="2001 UN197" bgcolor=#E9E9E9
| 0 ||  || MBA-M || 16.9 || 2.3 km || multiple || 2001–2020 || 14 Dec 2020 || 143 || align=left | Disc.: NEATAlt.: 2010 NG118 || 
|- id="2001 UW197" bgcolor=#d6d6d6
| 0 ||  || MBA-O || 16.50 || 2.8 km || multiple || 2001–2021 || 04 May 2021 || 140 || align=left | Disc.: NEATAlt.: 2015 CB56 || 
|- id="2001 UC198" bgcolor=#FA8072
| 0 ||  || MCA || 18.2 || data-sort-value="0.96" | 960 m || multiple || 2001–2018 || 13 Sep 2018 || 110 || align=left | Disc.: NEAT || 
|- id="2001 UP198" bgcolor=#FA8072
| 0 ||  || MCA || 18.7 || data-sort-value="0.54" | 540 m || multiple || 1998–2020 || 07 Dec 2020 || 130 || align=left | Disc.: NEATAlt.: 2004 PY56, 2010 PN3 || 
|- id="2001 UT198" bgcolor=#E9E9E9
| 0 ||  || MBA-M || 17.3 || 1.9 km || multiple || 2001–2021 || 06 Jan 2021 || 105 || align=left | Disc.: NEATAlt.: 2015 VX6 || 
|- id="2001 UY198" bgcolor=#fefefe
| 0 ||  || MBA-I || 19.2 || data-sort-value="0.43" | 430 m || multiple || 2001–2020 || 21 Jun 2020 || 43 || align=left | Disc.: NEAT || 
|- id="2001 UZ198" bgcolor=#d6d6d6
| 0 ||  || MBA-O || 16.70 || 2.5 km || multiple || 2001–2021 || 08 May 2021 || 94 || align=left | Disc.: NEAT || 
|- id="2001 UM199" bgcolor=#E9E9E9
| 2 ||  || MBA-M || 17.77 || 1.6 km || multiple || 2001–2015 || 01 Dec 2015 || 23 || align=left | Disc.: NEAT || 
|- id="2001 UV199" bgcolor=#E9E9E9
| 0 ||  || MBA-M || 16.6 || 1.4 km || multiple || 1997–2020 || 25 Apr 2020 || 199 || align=left | Disc.: NEATAlt.: 2007 GK12, 2010 XK38, 2013 QJ63 || 
|- id="2001 UX199" bgcolor=#d6d6d6
| 0 ||  || MBA-O || 16.67 || 2.6 km || multiple || 2001–2021 || 08 May 2021 || 101 || align=left | Disc.: NEAT || 
|- id="2001 UF200" bgcolor=#d6d6d6
| 1 ||  || MBA-O || 16.6 || 2.7 km || multiple || 2001–2020 || 03 Feb 2020 || 75 || align=left | Disc.: NEAT || 
|- id="2001 US200" bgcolor=#fefefe
| 0 ||  || MBA-I || 18.3 || data-sort-value="0.65" | 650 m || multiple || 2001–2020 || 15 Dec 2020 || 95 || align=left | Disc.: NEAT || 
|- id="2001 UU200" bgcolor=#d6d6d6
| 0 ||  || MBA-O || 15.8 || 3.9 km || multiple || 2001–2020 || 16 May 2020 || 225 || align=left | Disc.: NEATAlt.: 2009 BT102 || 
|- id="2001 UW200" bgcolor=#E9E9E9
| 0 ||  || MBA-M || 17.31 || 1.9 km || multiple || 1992–2021 || 16 Jan 2021 || 68 || align=left | Disc.: NEAT || 
|- id="2001 UZ200" bgcolor=#E9E9E9
| 0 ||  || MBA-M || 17.5 || 1.8 km || multiple || 2001–2020 || 16 Dec 2020 || 77 || align=left | Disc.: NEATAlt.: 2015 TF313 || 
|- id="2001 UB201" bgcolor=#E9E9E9
| 2 ||  || MBA-M || 17.6 || 1.3 km || multiple || 2001–2019 || 28 Dec 2019 || 39 || align=left | Disc.: NEATAlt.: 2014 QJ168 || 
|- id="2001 UM202" bgcolor=#E9E9E9
| 0 ||  || MBA-M || 17.04 || 1.6 km || multiple || 2001–2021 || 19 Apr 2021 || 173 || align=left | Disc.: NEATAlt.: 2008 HK39, 2014 SL156 || 
|- id="2001 UA203" bgcolor=#fefefe
| 0 ||  || MBA-I || 18.9 || data-sort-value="0.49" | 490 m || multiple || 2001–2018 || 06 Oct 2018 || 53 || align=left | Disc.: Spacewatch || 
|- id="2001 UA205" bgcolor=#fefefe
| 2 ||  || MBA-I || 18.7 || data-sort-value="0.54" | 540 m || multiple || 2001–2020 || 02 Feb 2020 || 112 || align=left | Disc.: NEAT || 
|- id="2001 UJ206" bgcolor=#E9E9E9
| 1 ||  || MBA-M || 18.0 || data-sort-value="0.75" | 750 m || multiple || 2001–2016 || 28 Mar 2016 || 49 || align=left | Disc.: Spacewatch || 
|- id="2001 UE207" bgcolor=#E9E9E9
| 1 ||  || MBA-M || 17.8 || 1.5 km || multiple || 2001–2021 || 19 Mar 2021 || 46 || align=left | Disc.: LINEAR || 
|- id="2001 UH207" bgcolor=#fefefe
| 0 ||  || MBA-I || 18.36 || data-sort-value="0.63" | 630 m || multiple || 1994–2021 || 01 Jul 2021 || 109 || align=left | Disc.: SpacewatchAlt.: 1994 SO3 || 
|- id="2001 UJ208" bgcolor=#d6d6d6
| 0 ||  || MBA-O || 16.49 || 2.8 km || multiple || 2001–2021 || 15 Apr 2021 || 120 || align=left | Disc.: LPL/Spacewatch IIAlt.: 2015 BO433 || 
|- id="2001 UR208" bgcolor=#fefefe
| 2 ||  || MBA-I || 18.6 || data-sort-value="0.57" | 570 m || multiple || 2001–2020 || 25 Dec 2020 || 46 || align=left | Disc.: LINEAR || 
|- id="2001 US208" bgcolor=#E9E9E9
| 2 ||  || MBA-M || 18.7 || data-sort-value="0.76" | 760 m || multiple || 2001–2018 || 10 Dec 2018 || 28 || align=left | Disc.: LINEARAdded on 22 July 2020Alt.: 2015 BT217 || 
|- id="2001 UT208" bgcolor=#E9E9E9
| 2 ||  || MBA-M || 18.0 || 1.1 km || multiple || 2001–2014 || 20 Sep 2014 || 34 || align=left | Disc.: LINEARAlt.: 2014 SE4 || 
|- id="2001 UX208" bgcolor=#E9E9E9
| 0 ||  || MBA-M || 17.5 || 1.8 km || multiple || 2001–2019 || 29 Nov 2019 || 68 || align=left | Disc.: LINEAR || 
|- id="2001 UY208" bgcolor=#fefefe
| 0 ||  || MBA-I || 17.8 || data-sort-value="0.82" | 820 m || multiple || 2001–2020 || 16 Dec 2020 || 113 || align=left | Disc.: LINEARAlt.: 2005 WN17, 2015 HD74 || 
|- id="2001 UF209" bgcolor=#d6d6d6
| 0 ||  || MBA-O || 17.4 || 1.8 km || multiple || 2001–2019 || 14 Jan 2019 || 65 || align=left | Disc.: LINEARAlt.: 2006 PV5 || 
|- id="2001 UM209" bgcolor=#fefefe
| 0 ||  || MBA-I || 17.99 || data-sort-value="0.75" | 750 m || multiple || 2001–2021 || 14 Apr 2021 || 126 || align=left | Disc.: NEAT || 
|- id="2001 UE210" bgcolor=#fefefe
| 0 ||  || MBA-I || 17.9 || data-sort-value="0.78" | 780 m || multiple || 2001–2020 || 17 Dec 2020 || 169 || align=left | Disc.: LINEAR || 
|- id="2001 UH210" bgcolor=#d6d6d6
| – ||  || MBA-O || 17.5 || 1.8 km || single || 35 days || 24 Oct 2001 || 14 || align=left | Disc.: LINEAR || 
|- id="2001 UK211" bgcolor=#fefefe
| 0 ||  || MBA-I || 18.3 || data-sort-value="0.65" | 650 m || multiple || 2001–2021 || 05 Jan 2021 || 115 || align=left | Disc.: LINEAR || 
|- id="2001 UQ211" bgcolor=#E9E9E9
| 0 ||  || MBA-M || 17.6 || 1.3 km || multiple || 2001–2020 || 26 Feb 2020 || 63 || align=left | Disc.: LINEAR || 
|- id="2001 UK213" bgcolor=#E9E9E9
| 0 ||  || MBA-M || 17.2 || 2.0 km || multiple || 2001–2021 || 18 Jan 2021 || 92 || align=left | Disc.: LINEAR || 
|- id="2001 UR213" bgcolor=#fefefe
| 1 ||  || MBA-I || 18.4 || data-sort-value="0.62" | 620 m || multiple || 2001–2021 || 01 Feb 2021 || 51 || align=left | Disc.: LINEAR || 
|- id="2001 UT214" bgcolor=#fefefe
| 1 ||  || MBA-I || 18.1 || data-sort-value="0.71" | 710 m || multiple || 2001–2020 || 24 Dec 2020 || 57 || align=left | Disc.: LINEAR || 
|- id="2001 UH215" bgcolor=#fefefe
| 1 ||  || MBA-I || 18.7 || data-sort-value="0.54" | 540 m || multiple || 2001–2019 || 21 Sep 2019 || 38 || align=left | Disc.: LINEAR || 
|- id="2001 UP215" bgcolor=#fefefe
| 0 ||  || MBA-I || 18.2 || data-sort-value="0.68" | 680 m || multiple || 2001–2020 || 06 Dec 2020 || 112 || align=left | Disc.: LINEARAlt.: 2009 EZ31 || 
|- id="2001 UW215" bgcolor=#fefefe
| 0 ||  || MBA-I || 18.41 || data-sort-value="0.62" | 620 m || multiple || 2001–2021 || 11 May 2021 || 63 || align=left | Disc.: SpacewatchAlt.: 2008 RY11, 2013 AW95 || 
|- id="2001 UY217" bgcolor=#fefefe
| – ||  || MBA-I || 19.3 || data-sort-value="0.41" | 410 m || single || 9 days || 27 Oct 2001 || 13 || align=left | Disc.: Spacewatch || 
|- id="2001 UJ219" bgcolor=#d6d6d6
| 0 ||  || MBA-O || 16.45 || 2.9 km || multiple || 2001–2021 || 20 Apr 2021 || 125 || align=left | Disc.: NEATAlt.: 2012 TL77 || 
|- id="2001 UK223" bgcolor=#E9E9E9
| 1 ||  || MBA-M || 18.5 || data-sort-value="0.84" | 840 m || multiple || 2001–2018 || 29 Nov 2018 || 42 || align=left | Disc.: LPL/Spacewatch II || 
|- id="2001 UL224" bgcolor=#d6d6d6
| 0 ||  || MBA-O || 16.1 || 3.4 km || multiple || 2001–2020 || 26 May 2020 || 161 || align=left | Disc.: NEATAlt.: 2012 XR70 || 
|- id="2001 US224" bgcolor=#d6d6d6
| 0 ||  || MBA-O || 16.5 || 2.8 km || multiple || 2001–2020 || 02 Apr 2020 || 112 || align=left | Disc.: NEATAlt.: 2012 TK300 || 
|- id="2001 UG225" bgcolor=#d6d6d6
| 0 ||  || MBA-O || 16.5 || 2.8 km || multiple || 2001–2019 || 20 Dec 2019 || 104 || align=left | Disc.: Kitt Peak Obs.Alt.: 2007 SC7, 2007 TD285, 2016 EO185, 2017 KK30 || 
|- id="2001 UC226" bgcolor=#d6d6d6
| 0 ||  || MBA-O || 16.30 || 3.1 km || multiple || 2001–2021 || 06 Apr 2021 || 84 || align=left | Disc.: NEATAlt.: 2012 TH237 || 
|- id="2001 UD226" bgcolor=#fefefe
| 0 ||  || MBA-I || 18.6 || data-sort-value="0.57" | 570 m || multiple || 2001–2020 || 29 Jul 2020 || 33 || align=left | Disc.: NEAT || 
|- id="2001 UL226" bgcolor=#E9E9E9
| 0 ||  || MBA-M || 17.9 || data-sort-value="0.78" | 780 m || multiple || 2001–2018 || 31 Dec 2018 || 34 || align=left | Disc.: NEAT || 
|- id="2001 UO226" bgcolor=#E9E9E9
| 0 ||  || MBA-M || 16.4 || 2.2 km || multiple || 2001–2021 || 21 Jan 2021 || 164 || align=left | Disc.: NEATAlt.: 2014 QO28 || 
|- id="2001 UT226" bgcolor=#d6d6d6
| 0 ||  || MBA-O || 16.56 || 2.7 km || multiple || 2001–2021 || 11 Oct 2021 || 103 || align=left | Disc.: NEAT || 
|- id="2001 UX226" bgcolor=#E9E9E9
| 0 ||  || MBA-M || 18.4 || 1.2 km || multiple || 2001–2019 || 24 Oct 2019 || 29 || align=left | Disc.: NEAT || 
|- id="2001 UA227" bgcolor=#fefefe
| 0 ||  || MBA-I || 18.81 || data-sort-value="0.51" | 510 m || multiple || 2001–2018 || 06 Oct 2018 || 64 || align=left | Disc.: NEAT || 
|- id="2001 UL227" bgcolor=#d6d6d6
| 0 ||  || MBA-O || 16.5 || 2.8 km || multiple || 2001–2021 || 14 Jun 2021 || 123 || align=left | Disc.: NEATAlt.: 2012 VM57 || 
|- id="2001 UN227" bgcolor=#E9E9E9
| 0 ||  || MBA-M || 18.3 || data-sort-value="0.65" | 650 m || multiple || 2001–2019 || 10 Jan 2019 || 25 || align=left | Disc.: NEAT || 
|- id="2001 UP227" bgcolor=#E9E9E9
| 0 ||  || MBA-M || 17.5 || 1.3 km || multiple || 2001–2020 || 25 May 2020 || 139 || align=left | Disc.: NEAT || 
|- id="2001 UA228" bgcolor=#fefefe
| 1 ||  || MBA-I || 18.7 || data-sort-value="0.54" | 540 m || multiple || 2001–2018 || 03 Oct 2018 || 34 || align=left | Disc.: NEAT || 
|- id="2001 UK228" bgcolor=#fefefe
| 0 ||  || MBA-I || 18.1 || data-sort-value="0.71" | 710 m || multiple || 2001–2019 || 28 Aug 2019 || 52 || align=left | Disc.: NEATAlt.: 2005 XV39, 2012 UX2 || 
|- id="2001 US228" bgcolor=#E9E9E9
| 0 ||  || MBA-M || 16.51 || 2.1 km || multiple || 2001–2021 || 11 May 2021 || 128 || align=left | Disc.: NEAT || 
|- id="2001 UT228" bgcolor=#d6d6d6
| 0 ||  || MBA-O || 16.16 || 3.3 km || multiple || 1996–2021 || 30 Aug 2021 || 248 || align=left | Disc.: NEATAlt.: 2015 HJ139 || 
|- id="2001 UW228" bgcolor=#fefefe
| 0 ||  || MBA-I || 18.4 || data-sort-value="0.62" | 620 m || multiple || 2001–2020 || 22 Jun 2020 || 93 || align=left | Disc.: NEATAlt.: 2014 MV12 || 
|- id="2001 UY228" bgcolor=#fefefe
| 0 ||  || MBA-I || 17.6 || data-sort-value="0.90" | 900 m || multiple || 2001–2021 || 09 Jan 2021 || 102 || align=left | Disc.: NEAT || 
|- id="2001 UA229" bgcolor=#E9E9E9
| 0 ||  || MBA-M || 17.4 || 1.4 km || multiple || 2001–2020 || 22 Jan 2020 || 85 || align=left | Disc.: NEATAlt.: 2010 VO4 || 
|- id="2001 UB229" bgcolor=#E9E9E9
| 0 ||  || MBA-M || 17.2 || 1.1 km || multiple || 2001–2020 || 21 Jan 2020 || 40 || align=left | Disc.: NEATAlt.: 2016 ED101 || 
|- id="2001 UC229" bgcolor=#C2FFFF
| 0 ||  || JT || 14.05 || 8.6 km || multiple || 2001–2021 || 26 Aug 2021 || 177 || align=left | Disc.: NEATTrojan camp (L5) || 
|- id="2001 UD229" bgcolor=#fefefe
| 0 ||  || MBA-I || 17.6 || data-sort-value="0.90" | 900 m || multiple || 2001–2021 || 12 Jan 2021 || 154 || align=left | Disc.: NEAT || 
|- id="2001 UH230" bgcolor=#E9E9E9
| – ||  || MBA-M || 18.2 || data-sort-value="0.68" | 680 m || single || 6 days || 24 Oct 2001 || 9 || align=left | Disc.: NEAT || 
|- id="2001 UJ230" bgcolor=#E9E9E9
| 0 ||  || MBA-M || 17.3 || 1.9 km || multiple || 2001–2020 || 23 Jan 2020 || 138 || align=left | Disc.: NEATAlt.: 2010 UQ65 || 
|- id="2001 UL230" bgcolor=#fefefe
| 0 ||  || MBA-I || 18.6 || data-sort-value="0.57" | 570 m || multiple || 2001–2020 || 17 Dec 2020 || 108 || align=left | Disc.: NEATAlt.: 2016 GF87 || 
|- id="2001 UO230" bgcolor=#d6d6d6
| 0 ||  || MBA-O || 16.8 || 2.4 km || multiple || 2001–2020 || 11 May 2020 || 85 || align=left | Disc.: SDSS || 
|- id="2001 US230" bgcolor=#fefefe
| 0 ||  || MBA-I || 17.4 || data-sort-value="0.98" | 980 m || multiple || 2001–2021 || 03 Jan 2021 || 105 || align=left | Disc.: SDSS || 
|- id="2001 UT230" bgcolor=#E9E9E9
| 0 ||  || MBA-M || 17.07 || 1.6 km || multiple || 2001–2021 || 08 May 2021 || 122 || align=left | Disc.: SDSS || 
|- id="2001 UC231" bgcolor=#E9E9E9
| 0 ||  || MBA-M || 16.65 || 2.0 km || multiple || 2001–2021 || 06 May 2021 || 173 || align=left | Disc.: NEATAlt.: 2010 VH107 || 
|- id="2001 UD231" bgcolor=#fefefe
| 0 ||  || MBA-I || 18.6 || data-sort-value="0.57" | 570 m || multiple || 2001–2020 || 20 Nov 2020 || 83 || align=left | Disc.: NEAT || 
|- id="2001 UF231" bgcolor=#fefefe
| 2 ||  || MBA-I || 19.3 || data-sort-value="0.45" | 410 m || multiple || 2001-2022 || 26 Nov 2022 || 42 || align=left | Disc.: NEAT || 
|- id="2001 UH231" bgcolor=#E9E9E9
| 1 ||  || MBA-M || 18.2 || data-sort-value="0.65" | 630 m || multiple || 2001-2022 || 31 Oct 2022 || 34 || align=left | Disc.: NEATAlt.: 2022 SR170 || 
|- id="2001 UM231" bgcolor=#fefefe
| 0 ||  || MBA-I || 19.07 || data-sort-value="0.46" | 460 m || multiple || 2001–2021 || 14 Apr 2021 || 32 || align=left | Disc.: NEAT || 
|- id="2001 UN231" bgcolor=#d6d6d6
| 0 ||  || MBA-O || 16.39 || 2.9 km || multiple || 2001–2021 || 09 May 2021 || 145 || align=left | Disc.: NEAT || 
|- id="2001 UO231" bgcolor=#d6d6d6
| 0 ||  || MBA-O || 16.3 || 3.1 km || multiple || 2001–2020 || 24 Jan 2020 || 76 || align=left | Disc.: NEATAlt.: 2018 UH6 || 
|- id="2001 UP231" bgcolor=#d6d6d6
| 0 ||  || MBA-O || 17.1 || 2.1 km || multiple || 2001–2017 || 15 Dec 2017 || 65 || align=left | Disc.: NEATAlt.: 2013 AV59 || 
|- id="2001 UT231" bgcolor=#fefefe
| 1 ||  || MBA-I || 18.4 || data-sort-value="0.62" | 620 m || multiple || 2001–2019 || 28 Nov 2019 || 43 || align=left | Disc.: NEATAlt.: 2012 VJ55 || 
|- id="2001 UU231" bgcolor=#E9E9E9
| 0 ||  || MBA-M || 17.87 || 1.1 km || multiple || 2001–2021 || 15 Apr 2021 || 47 || align=left | Disc.: NEATAdded on 9 March 2021 || 
|- id="2001 UV231" bgcolor=#fefefe
| 2 ||  || MBA-I || 18.2 || data-sort-value="0.68" | 680 m || multiple || 2001–2016 || 07 Nov 2016 || 37 || align=left | Disc.: NEAT || 
|- id="2001 UX231" bgcolor=#d6d6d6
| 0 ||  || MBA-O || 16.43 || 2.9 km || multiple || 2001–2021 || 15 May 2021 || 118 || align=left | Disc.: NEATAlt.: 2004 GP48 || 
|- id="2001 UB232" bgcolor=#fefefe
| 0 ||  || MBA-I || 18.39 || data-sort-value="0.62" | 620 m || multiple || 2001–2021 || 08 May 2021 || 70 || align=left | Disc.: NEATAlt.: 2008 SW8 || 
|- id="2001 UE232" bgcolor=#fefefe
| 0 ||  || MBA-I || 18.31 || data-sort-value="0.65" | 650 m || multiple || 2001–2019 || 27 Nov 2019 || 79 || align=left | Disc.: NEATAlt.: 2012 UH155 || 
|- id="2001 UF232" bgcolor=#d6d6d6
| 0 ||  || MBA-O || 16.6 || 2.7 km || multiple || 2001–2021 || 03 May 2021 || 72 || align=left | Disc.: LINEAR || 
|- id="2001 UG232" bgcolor=#E9E9E9
| 0 ||  || MBA-M || 17.14 || 1.6 km || multiple || 2001–2021 || 10 May 2021 || 202 || align=left | Disc.: LINEARAlt.: 2001 SD31 || 
|- id="2001 UH232" bgcolor=#fefefe
| 0 ||  || MBA-I || 18.7 || data-sort-value="0.54" | 540 m || multiple || 2001–2019 || 02 Nov 2019 || 52 || align=left | Disc.: NEAT || 
|- id="2001 UJ232" bgcolor=#d6d6d6
| 0 ||  || MBA-O || 15.9 || 3.7 km || multiple || 2000–2020 || 11 May 2020 || 158 || align=left | Disc.: NEATAlt.: 2014 DX6 || 
|- id="2001 UP232" bgcolor=#fefefe
| 0 ||  || MBA-I || 18.2 || data-sort-value="0.68" | 680 m || multiple || 2001–2019 || 20 Dec 2019 || 72 || align=left | Disc.: NEATAlt.: 2015 RO103 || 
|- id="2001 UQ232" bgcolor=#d6d6d6
| 0 ||  || MBA-O || 15.4 || 4.6 km || multiple || 2000–2021 || 06 Jun 2021 || 281 || align=left | Disc.: NEATAlt.: 2006 QW125, 2010 BA84, 2010 NW75, 2012 TB232, 2016 LY33 || 
|- id="2001 UR232" bgcolor=#C2FFFF
| 0 ||  || JT || 13.8 || 9.7 km || multiple || 2001–2020 || 10 Jun 2020 || 124 || align=left | Disc.: NEATTrojan camp (L5) || 
|- id="2001 US232" bgcolor=#C2FFFF
| 0 ||  || JT || 13.37 || 12 km || multiple || 2001–2021 || 04 Aug 2021 || 207 || align=left | Disc.: NEATTrojan camp (L5)Alt.: 2010 FM118, 2014 WU369, 2017 BF31 || 
|- id="2001 UU232" bgcolor=#d6d6d6
| 0 ||  || MBA-O || 16.35 || 3.0 km || multiple || 2001–2021 || 09 May 2021 || 152 || align=left | Disc.: LPL/Spacewatch II || 
|- id="2001 UY232" bgcolor=#d6d6d6
| 0 ||  || MBA-O || 16.62 || 2.6 km || multiple || 2001–2021 || 25 Sep 2021 || 137 || align=left | Disc.: Spacewatch || 
|- id="2001 UZ232" bgcolor=#C2FFFF
| 0 ||  || JT || 14.1 || 8.4 km || multiple || 2001–2020 || 14 Jul 2020 || 116 || align=left | Disc.: SpacewatchTrojan camp (L5) || 
|- id="2001 UB233" bgcolor=#fefefe
| 0 ||  || MBA-I || 18.2 || data-sort-value="0.68" | 680 m || multiple || 2001–2018 || 07 Nov 2018 || 86 || align=left | Disc.: SDSS || 
|- id="2001 UG233" bgcolor=#fefefe
| 0 ||  || MBA-I || 18.4 || data-sort-value="0.62" | 620 m || multiple || 2001–2018 || 05 Oct 2018 || 75 || align=left | Disc.: Spacewatch || 
|- id="2001 UH233" bgcolor=#fefefe
| 0 ||  || MBA-I || 17.4 || data-sort-value="0.98" | 980 m || multiple || 2001–2020 || 20 Apr 2020 || 163 || align=left | Disc.: NEAT || 
|- id="2001 UJ233" bgcolor=#d6d6d6
| 0 ||  || MBA-O || 17.16 || 2.1 km || multiple || 2001–2021 || 08 Sep 2021 || 94 || align=left | Disc.: SDSS || 
|- id="2001 UK233" bgcolor=#fefefe
| 0 ||  || MBA-I || 17.94 || data-sort-value="0.77" | 770 m || multiple || 2001–2021 || 08 May 2021 || 130 || align=left | Disc.: Spacewatch || 
|- id="2001 UL233" bgcolor=#d6d6d6
| 0 ||  || MBA-O || 16.6 || 2.7 km || multiple || 2001–2020 || 25 May 2020 || 79 || align=left | Disc.: Spacewatch || 
|- id="2001 UT233" bgcolor=#d6d6d6
| 0 ||  || MBA-O || 16.61 || 2.7 km || multiple || 2001–2021 || 22 May 2021 || 113 || align=left | Disc.: Spacewatch || 
|- id="2001 UU233" bgcolor=#E9E9E9
| 0 ||  || MBA-M || 18.1 || data-sort-value="0.71" | 710 m || multiple || 2001–2019 || 04 Feb 2019 || 88 || align=left | Disc.: LPL/Spacewatch II || 
|- id="2001 UV233" bgcolor=#E9E9E9
| 0 ||  || MBA-M || 17.69 || 1.2 km || multiple || 2005–2021 || 08 May 2021 || 75 || align=left | Disc.: LPL/Spacewatch II || 
|- id="2001 UW233" bgcolor=#d6d6d6
| 0 ||  || MBA-O || 16.5 || 2.8 km || multiple || 2001–2020 || 21 May 2020 || 87 || align=left | Disc.: Spacewatch || 
|- id="2001 UY233" bgcolor=#d6d6d6
| 0 ||  || MBA-O || 16.63 || 2.6 km || multiple || 2001–2021 || 11 Jun 2021 || 122 || align=left | Disc.: Spacewatch || 
|- id="2001 UA234" bgcolor=#E9E9E9
| 0 ||  || MBA-M || 17.4 || 1.8 km || multiple || 2001–2021 || 12 Jan 2021 || 83 || align=left | Disc.: Spacewatch || 
|- id="2001 UB234" bgcolor=#E9E9E9
| 0 ||  || MBA-M || 17.31 || 1.0 km || multiple || 2001–2021 || 23 Nov 2021 || 103 || align=left | Disc.: NEAT || 
|- id="2001 UC234" bgcolor=#E9E9E9
| 0 ||  || MBA-M || 17.3 || 1.9 km || multiple || 2001–2021 || 17 Jan 2021 || 92 || align=left | Disc.: SDSS || 
|- id="2001 UD234" bgcolor=#E9E9E9
| 0 ||  || MBA-M || 17.6 || 1.3 km || multiple || 2001–2018 || 14 Aug 2018 || 50 || align=left | Disc.: SDSS || 
|- id="2001 UE234" bgcolor=#E9E9E9
| 0 ||  || MBA-M || 17.3 || 1.5 km || multiple || 2001–2019 || 31 Oct 2019 || 66 || align=left | Disc.: Spacewatch || 
|- id="2001 UF234" bgcolor=#E9E9E9
| 0 ||  || MBA-M || 17.2 || 1.1 km || multiple || 2001–2021 || 11 Jun 2021 || 90 || align=left | Disc.: NEAT || 
|- id="2001 UG234" bgcolor=#d6d6d6
| 0 ||  || MBA-O || 16.85 || 2.4 km || multiple || 2001–2021 || 31 May 2021 || 71 || align=left | Disc.: LPL/Spacewatch II || 
|- id="2001 UH234" bgcolor=#d6d6d6
| 0 ||  || MBA-O || 16.45 || 2.9 km || multiple || 2001–2021 || 09 Apr 2021 || 80 || align=left | Disc.: Spacewatch || 
|- id="2001 UJ234" bgcolor=#fefefe
| 0 ||  || MBA-I || 17.3 || 1.0 km || multiple || 2001–2020 || 08 Nov 2020 || 110 || align=left | Disc.: LPL/Spacewatch II || 
|- id="2001 UK234" bgcolor=#fefefe
| 0 ||  || MBA-I || 17.5 || data-sort-value="0.94" | 940 m || multiple || 2001–2020 || 12 Dec 2020 || 119 || align=left | Disc.: SpacewatchAlt.: 2014 BR75 || 
|- id="2001 UM234" bgcolor=#d6d6d6
| 0 ||  || HIL || 15.22 || 5.0 km || multiple || 2001–2021 || 30 Jun 2021 || 86 || align=left | Disc.: Spacewatch || 
|- id="2001 UN234" bgcolor=#d6d6d6
| 0 ||  || MBA-O || 16.7 || 2.5 km || multiple || 2001–2020 || 21 Apr 2020 || 77 || align=left | Disc.: Spacewatch || 
|- id="2001 UO234" bgcolor=#E9E9E9
| 0 ||  || MBA-M || 17.8 || data-sort-value="0.82" | 820 m || multiple || 2001–2020 || 22 Apr 2020 || 56 || align=left | Disc.: Spacewatch || 
|- id="2001 UR234" bgcolor=#d6d6d6
| 0 ||  || MBA-O || 16.9 || 2.3 km || multiple || 2001–2021 || 13 May 2021 || 94 || align=left | Disc.: SpacewatchAlt.: 2012 TN272 || 
|- id="2001 US234" bgcolor=#fefefe
| 0 ||  || MBA-I || 18.16 || data-sort-value="0.69" | 690 m || multiple || 2001–2021 || 16 Apr 2021 || 71 || align=left | Disc.: NEAT || 
|- id="2001 UT234" bgcolor=#d6d6d6
| 0 ||  || MBA-O || 17.46 || 1.8 km || multiple || 2001–2022 || 26 Jan 2022 || 110 || align=left | Disc.: Spacewatch || 
|- id="2001 UU234" bgcolor=#d6d6d6
| 0 ||  || MBA-O || 17.1 || 2.1 km || multiple || 2001–2020 || 19 Apr 2020 || 59 || align=left | Disc.: LPL/Spacewatch II || 
|- id="2001 UV234" bgcolor=#fefefe
| 0 ||  || MBA-I || 18.7 || data-sort-value="0.54" | 540 m || multiple || 2001–2020 || 15 Feb 2020 || 52 || align=left | Disc.: NEAT || 
|- id="2001 UX234" bgcolor=#d6d6d6
| 0 ||  || MBA-O || 16.59 || 2.7 km || multiple || 2001–2021 || 07 Jul 2021 || 70 || align=left | Disc.: Spacewatch || 
|- id="2001 UY234" bgcolor=#E9E9E9
| 0 ||  || MBA-M || 18.1 || data-sort-value="0.71" | 710 m || multiple || 2001–2018 || 31 Dec 2018 || 40 || align=left | Disc.: SDSS || 
|- id="2001 UZ234" bgcolor=#fefefe
| 0 ||  || MBA-I || 18.18 || data-sort-value="0.69" | 690 m || multiple || 2001–2022 || 25 Jan 2022 || 59 || align=left | Disc.: Spacewatch || 
|- id="2001 UA235" bgcolor=#E9E9E9
| 1 ||  || MBA-M || 17.2 || 1.1 km || multiple || 2001–2017 || 23 Oct 2017 || 50 || align=left | Disc.: LPL/Spacewatch IIAlt.: 2009 TK45 || 
|- id="2001 UB235" bgcolor=#FA8072
| 1 ||  || MCA || 18.8 || data-sort-value="0.52" | 520 m || multiple || 2001–2021 || 18 Jan 2021 || 70 || align=left | Disc.: LPL/Spacewatch II || 
|- id="2001 UE235" bgcolor=#fefefe
| 0 ||  || MBA-I || 18.7 || data-sort-value="0.54" | 540 m || multiple || 2001–2020 || 16 Oct 2020 || 91 || align=left | Disc.: NEAT || 
|- id="2001 UG235" bgcolor=#FA8072
| 0 ||  || MCA || 18.8 || data-sort-value="0.52" | 520 m || multiple || 2001–2020 || 20 Oct 2020 || 98 || align=left | Disc.: NEAT || 
|- id="2001 UH235" bgcolor=#fefefe
| 0 ||  || MBA-I || 18.21 || data-sort-value="0.68" | 680 m || multiple || 2001–2022 || 27 Jan 2022 || 56 || align=left | Disc.: LPL/Spacewatch II || 
|- id="2001 UJ235" bgcolor=#E9E9E9
| 0 ||  || MBA-M || 17.60 || 1.3 km || multiple || 2001–2021 || 18 Apr 2021 || 54 || align=left | Disc.: SDSS || 
|- id="2001 UK235" bgcolor=#E9E9E9
| 0 ||  || MBA-M || 18.31 || data-sort-value="0.65" | 650 m || multiple || 2001–2021 || 13 Sep 2021 || 54 || align=left | Disc.: SDSS || 
|- id="2001 UL235" bgcolor=#d6d6d6
| 0 ||  || MBA-O || 17.2 || 2.0 km || multiple || 2001–2020 || 22 Jun 2020 || 44 || align=left | Disc.: Spacewatch || 
|- id="2001 UM235" bgcolor=#E9E9E9
| 0 ||  || MBA-M || 17.37 || 1.4 km || multiple || 2001–2021 || 09 Apr 2021 || 74 || align=left | Disc.: NEAT || 
|- id="2001 UN235" bgcolor=#E9E9E9
| 0 ||  || MBA-M || 17.2 || 1.5 km || multiple || 2001–2020 || 03 Jan 2020 || 49 || align=left | Disc.: LPL/Spacewatch IIAlt.: 2016 BW24 || 
|- id="2001 UO235" bgcolor=#d6d6d6
| 0 ||  || MBA-O || 17.12 || 2.1 km || multiple || 2001–2021 || 15 Apr 2021 || 50 || align=left | Disc.: LPL/Spacewatch II || 
|- id="2001 UQ235" bgcolor=#fefefe
| 0 ||  || MBA-I || 18.6 || data-sort-value="0.57" | 570 m || multiple || 2001–2020 || 23 Nov 2020 || 77 || align=left | Disc.: Spacewatch || 
|- id="2001 US235" bgcolor=#fefefe
| 0 ||  || MBA-I || 19.0 || data-sort-value="0.47" | 470 m || multiple || 2001–2020 || 15 Dec 2020 || 39 || align=left | Disc.: Spacewatch || 
|- id="2001 UT235" bgcolor=#fefefe
| 4 ||  || MBA-I || 19.2 || data-sort-value="0.43" | 430 m || multiple || 2001–2012 || 17 Nov 2012 || 32 || align=left | Disc.: LPL/Spacewatch II || 
|- id="2001 UU235" bgcolor=#E9E9E9
| 0 ||  || MBA-M || 18.22 || 1.3 km || multiple || 2001–2021 || 07 Apr 2021 || 63 || align=left | Disc.: SpacewatchAlt.: 2016 AB156 || 
|- id="2001 UV235" bgcolor=#fefefe
| 0 ||  || MBA-I || 18.2 || data-sort-value="0.68" | 680 m || multiple || 2001–2019 || 27 Oct 2019 || 67 || align=left | Disc.: SpacewatchAlt.: 2019 NA23 || 
|- id="2001 UW235" bgcolor=#fefefe
| 0 ||  || MBA-I || 17.85 || data-sort-value="0.80" | 800 m || multiple || 2001–2021 || 11 Apr 2021 || 45 || align=left | Disc.: NEAT || 
|- id="2001 UX235" bgcolor=#d6d6d6
| 1 ||  || MBA-O || 16.7 || 2.5 km || multiple || 2001–2021 || 12 Jan 2021 || 36 || align=left | Disc.: SpacewatchAlt.: 2010 KB74 || 
|- id="2001 UY235" bgcolor=#E9E9E9
| 0 ||  || MBA-M || 17.8 || 1.5 km || multiple || 2001–2019 || 01 Nov 2019 || 71 || align=left | Disc.: SpacewatchAlt.: 2010 OA33 || 
|- id="2001 UZ235" bgcolor=#d6d6d6
| 0 ||  || MBA-O || 16.5 || 2.8 km || multiple || 2001–2021 || 31 May 2021 || 42 || align=left | Disc.: LPL/Spacewatch II || 
|- id="2001 UA236" bgcolor=#E9E9E9
| 0 ||  || MBA-M || 18.31 || data-sort-value="0.65" | 650 m || multiple || 2001–2021 || 08 May 2021 || 42 || align=left | Disc.: NEAT || 
|- id="2001 UB236" bgcolor=#E9E9E9
| 1 ||  || MBA-M || 17.2 || 2.0 km || multiple || 2001–2020 || 26 Jan 2020 || 52 || align=left | Disc.: Spacewatch || 
|- id="2001 UC236" bgcolor=#fefefe
| 0 ||  || MBA-I || 17.4 || data-sort-value="0.98" | 980 m || multiple || 2001–2021 || 05 Jun 2021 || 191 || align=left | Disc.: NEATAlt.: 2015 VP73 || 
|- id="2001 UD236" bgcolor=#C2FFFF
| 0 ||  || JT || 14.7 || 6.4 km || multiple || 2001–2020 || 24 Jun 2020 || 52 || align=left | Disc.: AstrovirtelTrojan camp (L5)Alt.: 2019 GA22 || 
|- id="2001 UE236" bgcolor=#fefefe
| 2 ||  || MBA-I || 18.7 || data-sort-value="0.54" | 540 m || multiple || 2001–2021 || 14 Jan 2021 || 27 || align=left | Disc.: NEAT || 
|- id="2001 UF236" bgcolor=#FA8072
| 1 ||  || MCA || 18.6 || data-sort-value="0.57" | 570 m || multiple || 2001–2015 || 03 Oct 2015 || 25 || align=left | Disc.: NEAT || 
|- id="2001 UH236" bgcolor=#fefefe
| 1 ||  || MBA-I || 18.4 || data-sort-value="0.62" | 620 m || multiple || 2001–2019 || 27 Nov 2019 || 85 || align=left | Disc.: Spacewatch || 
|- id="2001 UJ236" bgcolor=#E9E9E9
| 0 ||  || MBA-M || 17.2 || 2.0 km || multiple || 2001–2021 || 12 Feb 2021 || 158 || align=left | Disc.: NEATAlt.: 2010 OX118, 2010 UB3 || 
|- id="2001 UK236" bgcolor=#E9E9E9
| 0 ||  || MBA-M || 16.8 || 2.4 km || multiple || 2001–2021 || 15 Jan 2021 || 86 || align=left | Disc.: NEAT || 
|- id="2001 UL236" bgcolor=#E9E9E9
| 0 ||  || MBA-M || 17.2 || 1.1 km || multiple || 1995–2020 || 23 Apr 2020 || 110 || align=left | Disc.: NEAT || 
|- id="2001 UM236" bgcolor=#fefefe
| 0 ||  || MBA-I || 18.25 || data-sort-value="0.67" | 670 m || multiple || 2001–2021 || 08 May 2021 || 89 || align=left | Disc.: Spacewatch || 
|- id="2001 UN236" bgcolor=#E9E9E9
| 0 ||  || MBA-M || 17.4 || 1.8 km || multiple || 2001–2019 || 28 Nov 2019 || 74 || align=left | Disc.: Spacewatch || 
|- id="2001 UO236" bgcolor=#d6d6d6
| 0 ||  || HIL || 16.2 || 3.2 km || multiple || 1995–2020 || 22 Apr 2020 || 82 || align=left | Disc.: Spacewatch || 
|- id="2001 UP236" bgcolor=#E9E9E9
| 0 ||  || MBA-M || 17.4 || 1.8 km || multiple || 2001–2019 || 19 Dec 2019 || 78 || align=left | Disc.: Spacewatch || 
|- id="2001 UQ236" bgcolor=#E9E9E9
| 0 ||  || MBA-M || 17.5 || 1.3 km || multiple || 2001–2019 || 24 Dec 2019 || 99 || align=left | Disc.: Spacewatch || 
|- id="2001 UR236" bgcolor=#E9E9E9
| 0 ||  || MBA-M || 17.2 || 1.1 km || multiple || 2001–2020 || 21 Apr 2020 || 82 || align=left | Disc.: SDSS || 
|- id="2001 US236" bgcolor=#fefefe
| 1 ||  || MBA-I || 18.6 || data-sort-value="0.57" | 570 m || multiple || 2001–2019 || 02 Nov 2019 || 69 || align=left | Disc.: Spacewatch || 
|- id="2001 UT236" bgcolor=#C2FFFF
| 0 ||  || JT || 13.9 || 9.2 km || multiple || 2001–2020 || 15 Jun 2020 || 87 || align=left | Disc.: SpacewatchTrojan camp (L5) || 
|- id="2001 UU236" bgcolor=#E9E9E9
| 0 ||  || MBA-M || 17.1 || 2.1 km || multiple || 2001–2021 || 14 Jan 2021 || 71 || align=left | Disc.: Spacewatch || 
|- id="2001 UV236" bgcolor=#d6d6d6
| 0 ||  || MBA-O || 17.0 || 2.2 km || multiple || 2001–2020 || 16 May 2020 || 78 || align=left | Disc.: Spacewatch || 
|- id="2001 UW236" bgcolor=#E9E9E9
| 0 ||  || MBA-M || 17.5 || 1.8 km || multiple || 2001–2021 || 24 Jan 2021 || 68 || align=left | Disc.: LPL/Spacewatch II || 
|- id="2001 UX236" bgcolor=#d6d6d6
| 0 ||  || MBA-O || 16.7 || 2.5 km || multiple || 2001–2020 || 22 Apr 2020 || 76 || align=left | Disc.: Spacewatch || 
|- id="2001 UY236" bgcolor=#E9E9E9
| 0 ||  || MBA-M || 17.5 || 1.8 km || multiple || 2001–2020 || 21 Jan 2020 || 62 || align=left | Disc.: Spacewatch || 
|- id="2001 UZ236" bgcolor=#E9E9E9
| 0 ||  || MBA-M || 18.0 || 1.4 km || multiple || 2001–2019 || 25 Oct 2019 || 57 || align=left | Disc.: Spacewatch || 
|- id="2001 UA237" bgcolor=#E9E9E9
| 0 ||  || MBA-M || 17.65 || 1.2 km || multiple || 2001–2021 || 11 May 2021 || 78 || align=left | Disc.: Spacewatch || 
|- id="2001 UB237" bgcolor=#fefefe
| 0 ||  || MBA-I || 18.0 || data-sort-value="0.75" | 750 m || multiple || 2001–2019 || 26 Oct 2019 || 60 || align=left | Disc.: Spacewatch || 
|- id="2001 UC237" bgcolor=#fefefe
| 0 ||  || MBA-I || 18.56 || data-sort-value="0.58" | 580 m || multiple || 2001–2021 || 09 Dec 2021 || 75 || align=left | Disc.: Spacewatch || 
|- id="2001 UD237" bgcolor=#E9E9E9
| 0 ||  || MBA-M || 17.54 || 1.7 km || multiple || 2001–2022 || 07 Jan 2022 || 56 || align=left | Disc.: SDSS || 
|- id="2001 UE237" bgcolor=#E9E9E9
| 0 ||  || MBA-M || 17.6 || 1.7 km || multiple || 2001–2019 || 02 Oct 2019 || 55 || align=left | Disc.: LPL/Spacewatch II || 
|- id="2001 UG237" bgcolor=#d6d6d6
| 0 ||  || MBA-O || 17.01 || 2.2 km || multiple || 2001–2021 || 13 Apr 2021 || 62 || align=left | Disc.: SDSS || 
|- id="2001 UH237" bgcolor=#fefefe
| 0 ||  || MBA-I || 18.4 || data-sort-value="0.62" | 620 m || multiple || 2001–2019 || 08 Nov 2019 || 53 || align=left | Disc.: NEAT || 
|- id="2001 UJ237" bgcolor=#fefefe
| 0 ||  || MBA-I || 18.9 || data-sort-value="0.49" | 490 m || multiple || 2001–2019 || 04 Dec 2019 || 63 || align=left | Disc.: LPL/Spacewatch II || 
|- id="2001 UK237" bgcolor=#fefefe
| 0 ||  || MBA-I || 18.15 || data-sort-value="0.70" | 700 m || multiple || 2001–2021 || 08 Oct 2021 || 115 || align=left | Disc.: Spacewatch || 
|- id="2001 UL237" bgcolor=#d6d6d6
| 0 ||  || MBA-O || 16.9 || 2.3 km || multiple || 2001–2020 || 17 May 2020 || 68 || align=left | Disc.: SDSS || 
|- id="2001 UM237" bgcolor=#E9E9E9
| 0 ||  || MBA-M || 17.8 || 1.2 km || multiple || 2001–2019 || 03 Jan 2019 || 59 || align=left | Disc.: NEAT || 
|- id="2001 UO237" bgcolor=#d6d6d6
| 0 ||  || MBA-O || 16.0 || 3.5 km || multiple || 2001–2020 || 25 May 2020 || 125 || align=left | Disc.: SDSS || 
|- id="2001 UP237" bgcolor=#fefefe
| 0 ||  || MBA-I || 19.06 || data-sort-value="0.46" | 460 m || multiple || 2001–2018 || 14 Dec 2018 || 59 || align=left | Disc.: NEAT || 
|- id="2001 UQ237" bgcolor=#fefefe
| 2 ||  || MBA-I || 18.7 || data-sort-value="0.54" | 540 m || multiple || 2001–2019 || 28 Nov 2019 || 50 || align=left | Disc.: LPL/Spacewatch II || 
|- id="2001 UR237" bgcolor=#fefefe
| 0 ||  || MBA-I || 18.55 || data-sort-value="0.58" | 580 m || multiple || 2001–2021 || 15 Apr 2021 || 66 || align=left | Disc.: NEAT || 
|- id="2001 US237" bgcolor=#d6d6d6
| 0 ||  || MBA-O || 16.95 || 2.3 km || multiple || 2001–2021 || 13 Apr 2021 || 69 || align=left | Disc.: LPL/Spacewatch II || 
|- id="2001 UT237" bgcolor=#d6d6d6
| 0 ||  || MBA-O || 16.8 || 2.4 km || multiple || 2001–2018 || 29 Sep 2018 || 47 || align=left | Disc.: LPL/Spacewatch II || 
|- id="2001 UU237" bgcolor=#E9E9E9
| 1 ||  || MBA-M || 18.2 || data-sort-value="0.96" | 960 m || multiple || 2001–2018 || 11 Nov 2018 || 49 || align=left | Disc.: SpacewatchAlt.: 2005 TY190 || 
|- id="2001 UV237" bgcolor=#E9E9E9
| 1 ||  || MBA-M || 18.4 || 1.2 km || multiple || 2001–2019 || 02 Nov 2019 || 44 || align=left | Disc.: Spacewatch || 
|- id="2001 UW237" bgcolor=#E9E9E9
| 0 ||  || MBA-M || 17.5 || 1.8 km || multiple || 2001–2019 || 25 Sep 2019 || 42 || align=left | Disc.: LPL/Spacewatch II || 
|- id="2001 UX237" bgcolor=#E9E9E9
| 0 ||  || MBA-M || 17.6 || 1.7 km || multiple || 2001–2019 || 24 Sep 2019 || 42 || align=left | Disc.: SDSS || 
|- id="2001 UY237" bgcolor=#fefefe
| 0 ||  || MBA-I || 18.2 || data-sort-value="0.68" | 680 m || multiple || 2001–2019 || 29 Oct 2019 || 47 || align=left | Disc.: SDSS || 
|- id="2001 UA238" bgcolor=#E9E9E9
| 0 ||  || MBA-M || 17.30 || 1.5 km || multiple || 2001–2021 || 31 Mar 2021 || 84 || align=left | Disc.: SpacewatchAlt.: 2017 GW11 || 
|- id="2001 UB238" bgcolor=#E9E9E9
| 1 ||  || MBA-M || 17.7 || 1.6 km || multiple || 2001–2019 || 28 Nov 2019 || 45 || align=left | Disc.: Spacewatch || 
|- id="2001 UC238" bgcolor=#fefefe
| 1 ||  || MBA-I || 18.1 || data-sort-value="0.71" | 710 m || multiple || 2001–2019 || 29 Sep 2019 || 36 || align=left | Disc.: SDSS || 
|- id="2001 UD238" bgcolor=#fefefe
| 0 ||  || MBA-I || 19.4 || data-sort-value="0.39" | 390 m || multiple || 2001–2018 || 10 Nov 2018 || 44 || align=left | Disc.: NEAT || 
|- id="2001 UE238" bgcolor=#E9E9E9
| 0 ||  || MBA-M || 18.01 || 1.1 km || multiple || 2001–2021 || 30 Jun 2021 || 42 || align=left | Disc.: Spacewatch || 
|- id="2001 UF238" bgcolor=#d6d6d6
| 0 ||  || MBA-O || 16.87 || 2.4 km || multiple || 2001–2021 || 10 May 2021 || 69 || align=left | Disc.: SDSS || 
|- id="2001 UG238" bgcolor=#E9E9E9
| 0 ||  || MBA-M || 17.59 || data-sort-value="0.90" | 900 m || multiple || 2001–2021 || 08 Jun 2021 || 40 || align=left | Disc.: NEAT || 
|- id="2001 UH238" bgcolor=#d6d6d6
| 0 ||  || MBA-O || 16.79 || 2.4 km || multiple || 2001–2021 || 10 Apr 2021 || 55 || align=left | Disc.: LPL/Spacewatch II || 
|- id="2001 UJ238" bgcolor=#E9E9E9
| 0 ||  || MBA-M || 17.54 || data-sort-value="0.92" | 920 m || multiple || 2001–2021 || 22 May 2021 || 38 || align=left | Disc.: NEAT || 
|- id="2001 UK238" bgcolor=#E9E9E9
| 1 ||  || MBA-M || 18.1 || 1.0 km || multiple || 2001–2018 || 29 Nov 2018 || 36 || align=left | Disc.: Spacewatch || 
|- id="2001 UL238" bgcolor=#fefefe
| 0 ||  || MBA-I || 18.69 || data-sort-value="0.54" | 540 m || multiple || 2001–2021 || 04 Aug 2021 || 45 || align=left | Disc.: NEAT || 
|- id="2001 UM238" bgcolor=#d6d6d6
| 0 ||  || MBA-O || 16.8 || 2.4 km || multiple || 2001–2020 || 22 Apr 2020 || 42 || align=left | Disc.: Spacewatch || 
|- id="2001 UN238" bgcolor=#fefefe
| 0 ||  || MBA-I || 19.0 || data-sort-value="0.47" | 470 m || multiple || 2001–2018 || 14 Aug 2018 || 34 || align=left | Disc.: SDSS || 
|- id="2001 UO238" bgcolor=#fefefe
| 1 ||  || HUN || 19.0 || data-sort-value="0.47" | 470 m || multiple || 1995–2019 || 27 Oct 2019 || 37 || align=left | Disc.: NEAT || 
|- id="2001 UP238" bgcolor=#fefefe
| 0 ||  || MBA-I || 18.96 || data-sort-value="0.48" | 480 m || multiple || 2001–2021 || 09 Jul 2021 || 54 || align=left | Disc.: Spacewatch || 
|- id="2001 UQ238" bgcolor=#d6d6d6
| 1 ||  || MBA-O || 17.3 || 1.9 km || multiple || 2001–2019 || 26 Jan 2019 || 33 || align=left | Disc.: SDSS || 
|- id="2001 UR238" bgcolor=#E9E9E9
| 0 ||  || MBA-M || 17.5 || 1.8 km || multiple || 2001–2019 || 27 Nov 2019 || 37 || align=left | Disc.: Spacewatch || 
|- id="2001 UT238" bgcolor=#E9E9E9
| 2 ||  || MBA-M || 18.9 || data-sort-value="0.92" | 920 m || multiple || 2001–2019 || 02 Nov 2019 || 36 || align=left | Disc.: LPL/Spacewatch II || 
|- id="2001 UU238" bgcolor=#fefefe
| 0 ||  || HUN || 18.5 || data-sort-value="0.59" | 590 m || multiple || 2001–2021 || 16 Jan 2021 || 65 || align=left | Disc.: NEAT || 
|- id="2001 UV238" bgcolor=#fefefe
| 0 ||  || MBA-I || 18.91 || data-sort-value="0.49" | 490 m || multiple || 2001–2021 || 01 Nov 2021 || 62 || align=left | Disc.: Spacewatch || 
|- id="2001 UW238" bgcolor=#E9E9E9
| 0 ||  || MBA-M || 17.6 || 1.7 km || multiple || 2001–2021 || 17 Jan 2021 || 86 || align=left | Disc.: NEAT || 
|- id="2001 UX238" bgcolor=#fefefe
| 1 ||  || MBA-I || 19.0 || data-sort-value="0.47" | 470 m || multiple || 2001–2018 || 17 Aug 2018 || 32 || align=left | Disc.: Spacewatch || 
|- id="2001 UY238" bgcolor=#fefefe
| 1 ||  || MBA-I || 19.3 || data-sort-value="0.41" | 410 m || multiple || 2001–2018 || 05 Oct 2018 || 36 || align=left | Disc.: SDSS || 
|- id="2001 UA239" bgcolor=#E9E9E9
| 2 ||  || MBA-M || 18.7 || data-sort-value="0.54" | 540 m || multiple || 2001–2019 || 25 Jan 2019 || 33 || align=left | Disc.: NEAT || 
|- id="2001 UB239" bgcolor=#d6d6d6
| 0 ||  || MBA-O || 17.3 || 1.9 km || multiple || 2001–2020 || 22 Apr 2020 || 31 || align=left | Disc.: LPL/Spacewatch II || 
|- id="2001 UC239" bgcolor=#E9E9E9
| 0 ||  || MBA-M || 16.27 || 1.7 km || multiple || 2001–2021 || 11 Sep 2021 || 98 || align=left | Disc.: LONEOSAlt.: 2017 RB3 || 
|- id="2001 UD239" bgcolor=#E9E9E9
| 1 ||  || MBA-M || 18.7 || data-sort-value="0.76" | 760 m || multiple || 2001–2018 || 12 Nov 2018 || 36 || align=left | Disc.: LPL/Spacewatch II || 
|- id="2001 UE239" bgcolor=#fefefe
| 0 ||  || MBA-I || 18.6 || data-sort-value="0.57" | 570 m || multiple || 2001–2019 || 26 Jul 2019 || 32 || align=left | Disc.: Spacewatch || 
|- id="2001 UF239" bgcolor=#d6d6d6
| 0 ||  || MBA-O || 16.90 || 2.3 km || multiple || 2001–2021 || 08 Aug 2021 || 39 || align=left | Disc.: Spacewatch || 
|- id="2001 UG239" bgcolor=#E9E9E9
| 1 ||  || MBA-M || 17.9 || 1.5 km || multiple || 2001–2019 || 03 Oct 2019 || 124 || align=left | Disc.: Spacewatch || 
|- id="2001 UH239" bgcolor=#E9E9E9
| 0 ||  || MBA-M || 17.2 || 2.0 km || multiple || 2001–2020 || 15 Dec 2020 || 106 || align=left | Disc.: Spacewatch || 
|- id="2001 UJ239" bgcolor=#C2FFFF
| 0 ||  || JT || 14.1 || 8.4 km || multiple || 2001–2020 || 21 Jun 2020 || 76 || align=left | Disc.: SpacewatchTrojan camp (L5) || 
|- id="2001 UK239" bgcolor=#E9E9E9
| 0 ||  || MBA-M || 17.3 || 1.9 km || multiple || 1999–2021 || 18 Jan 2021 || 68 || align=left | Disc.: LPL/Spacewatch II || 
|- id="2001 UL239" bgcolor=#E9E9E9
| 0 ||  || MBA-M || 17.5 || 1.3 km || multiple || 2001–2019 || 19 Nov 2019 || 52 || align=left | Disc.: LPL/Spacewatch II || 
|- id="2001 UM239" bgcolor=#fefefe
| 0 ||  || MBA-I || 18.5 || data-sort-value="0.59" | 590 m || multiple || 2001–2019 || 06 Sep 2019 || 53 || align=left | Disc.: LPL/Spacewatch II || 
|- id="2001 UN239" bgcolor=#fefefe
| 0 ||  || MBA-I || 18.42 || data-sort-value="0.62" | 620 m || multiple || 2001–2021 || 13 May 2021 || 73 || align=left | Disc.: LPL/Spacewatch II || 
|- id="2001 UO239" bgcolor=#fefefe
| 0 ||  || MBA-I || 17.8 || data-sort-value="0.82" | 820 m || multiple || 2001–2021 || 15 Jan 2021 || 124 || align=left | Disc.: NEAT || 
|- id="2001 UP239" bgcolor=#fefefe
| 0 ||  || MBA-I || 18.4 || data-sort-value="0.62" | 620 m || multiple || 2001–2019 || 03 Oct 2019 || 43 || align=left | Disc.: Spacewatch || 
|- id="2001 UQ239" bgcolor=#C2FFFF
| 0 ||  || JT || 14.4 || 7.3 km || multiple || 2001–2020 || 26 May 2020 || 64 || align=left | Disc.: SDSSTrojan camp (L5) || 
|- id="2001 UR239" bgcolor=#d6d6d6
| 0 ||  || MBA-O || 17.3 || 1.9 km || multiple || 2001–2020 || 20 Oct 2020 || 74 || align=left | Disc.: Spacewatch || 
|- id="2001 US239" bgcolor=#fefefe
| 0 ||  || MBA-I || 18.0 || data-sort-value="0.75" | 750 m || multiple || 2001–2021 || 16 Jan 2021 || 84 || align=left | Disc.: Spacewatch || 
|- id="2001 UT239" bgcolor=#d6d6d6
| 0 ||  || MBA-O || 16.9 || 2.3 km || multiple || 2001–2017 || 07 Nov 2017 || 34 || align=left | Disc.: Spacewatch || 
|- id="2001 UU239" bgcolor=#E9E9E9
| 0 ||  || MBA-M || 18.0 || 1.4 km || multiple || 2001–2021 || 18 Jan 2021 || 51 || align=left | Disc.: SDSS || 
|- id="2001 UV239" bgcolor=#E9E9E9
| 0 ||  || MBA-M || 17.73 || data-sort-value="0.85" | 850 m || multiple || 2001–2021 || 28 Jul 2021 || 43 || align=left | Disc.: NEAT || 
|- id="2001 UX239" bgcolor=#d6d6d6
| 0 ||  || MBA-O || 16.7 || 2.5 km || multiple || 2001–2021 || 18 Jan 2021 || 147 || align=left | Disc.: SpacewatchAlt.: 2018 PB25 || 
|- id="2001 UY239" bgcolor=#E9E9E9
| 0 ||  || MBA-M || 17.7 || 1.6 km || multiple || 2001–2021 || 15 Jan 2021 || 49 || align=left | Disc.: Spacewatch || 
|- id="2001 UZ239" bgcolor=#d6d6d6
| 0 ||  || MBA-O || 17.0 || 2.2 km || multiple || 2001–2020 || 11 Jun 2020 || 72 || align=left | Disc.: Spacewatch || 
|- id="2001 UA240" bgcolor=#fefefe
| 0 ||  || MBA-I || 18.3 || data-sort-value="0.65" | 650 m || multiple || 2001–2021 || 09 Jan 2021 || 74 || align=left | Disc.: Spacewatch || 
|- id="2001 UB240" bgcolor=#d6d6d6
| 0 ||  || MBA-O || 17.0 || 2.2 km || multiple || 2001–2020 || 13 May 2020 || 46 || align=left | Disc.: SDSS || 
|- id="2001 UC240" bgcolor=#fefefe
| 2 ||  || MBA-I || 19.0 || data-sort-value="0.47" | 470 m || multiple || 2001–2018 || 14 Jun 2018 || 27 || align=left | Disc.: LPL/Spacewatch II || 
|- id="2001 UD240" bgcolor=#fefefe
| 0 ||  || MBA-I || 18.4 || data-sort-value="0.62" | 620 m || multiple || 2001–2020 || 14 Feb 2020 || 82 || align=left | Disc.: Spacewatch || 
|- id="2001 UE240" bgcolor=#C2FFFF
| 0 ||  || JT || 14.15 || 8.2 km || multiple || 2001–2021 || 08 Aug 2021 || 146 || align=left | Disc.: SpacewatchTrojan camp (L5) || 
|- id="2001 UF240" bgcolor=#fefefe
| 0 ||  || MBA-I || 17.8 || data-sort-value="0.82" | 820 m || multiple || 2001–2020 || 06 Dec 2020 || 118 || align=left | Disc.: SDSS || 
|- id="2001 UG240" bgcolor=#E9E9E9
| 0 ||  || MBA-M || 18.1 || 1.3 km || multiple || 2001–2019 || 01 Nov 2019 || 52 || align=left | Disc.: Spacewatch || 
|- id="2001 UH240" bgcolor=#d6d6d6
| 0 ||  || MBA-O || 16.87 || 2.4 km || multiple || 2001–2021 || 03 May 2021 || 74 || align=left | Disc.: LPL/Spacewatch II || 
|- id="2001 UJ240" bgcolor=#E9E9E9
| 1 ||  || MBA-M || 18.5 || 1.1 km || multiple || 2001–2020 || 23 Jan 2020 || 47 || align=left | Disc.: Spacewatch || 
|- id="2001 UK240" bgcolor=#fefefe
| 0 ||  || MBA-I || 18.91 || data-sort-value="0.49" | 490 m || multiple || 2001–2021 || 06 Nov 2021 || 79 || align=left | Disc.: Spacewatch || 
|- id="2001 UL240" bgcolor=#E9E9E9
| 0 ||  || MBA-M || 17.9 || 1.1 km || multiple || 2001–2020 || 26 Jan 2020 || 43 || align=left | Disc.: Spacewatch || 
|- id="2001 UM240" bgcolor=#d6d6d6
| 0 ||  || MBA-O || 16.8 || 2.4 km || multiple || 2001–2020 || 22 Apr 2020 || 49 || align=left | Disc.: Spacewatch || 
|- id="2001 UO240" bgcolor=#E9E9E9
| 0 ||  || MBA-M || 17.5 || 1.3 km || multiple || 2001–2020 || 22 Apr 2020 || 59 || align=left | Disc.: Spacewatch || 
|- id="2001 UP240" bgcolor=#d6d6d6
| 0 ||  || MBA-O || 16.87 || 2.4 km || multiple || 1996–2021 || 08 Aug 2021 || 70 || align=left | Disc.: NEAT || 
|- id="2001 UQ240" bgcolor=#fefefe
| 1 ||  || MBA-I || 18.1 || data-sort-value="0.71" | 710 m || multiple || 2001–2019 || 20 Dec 2019 || 36 || align=left | Disc.: NEAT || 
|- id="2001 UR240" bgcolor=#d6d6d6
| 0 ||  || MBA-O || 16.9 || 2.3 km || multiple || 2001–2021 || 07 Jun 2021 || 58 || align=left | Disc.: SDSS || 
|- id="2001 US240" bgcolor=#E9E9E9
| 0 ||  || MBA-M || 17.9 || 1.5 km || multiple || 2001–2021 || 04 Jan 2021 || 37 || align=left | Disc.: SDSS || 
|- id="2001 UT240" bgcolor=#fefefe
| 2 ||  || MBA-I || 19.2 || data-sort-value="0.43" | 430 m || multiple || 1995–2016 || 27 Aug 2016 || 28 || align=left | Disc.: Spacewatch || 
|- id="2001 UU240" bgcolor=#d6d6d6
| 0 ||  || MBA-O || 17.15 || 2.1 km || multiple || 2001–2021 || 08 Jun 2021 || 36 || align=left | Disc.: Spacewatch || 
|- id="2001 UV240" bgcolor=#fefefe
| 1 ||  || MBA-I || 19.6 || data-sort-value="0.36" | 360 m || multiple || 2001–2020 || 11 Sep 2020 || 43 || align=left | Disc.: LPL/Spacewatch IIAdded on 22 July 2020 || 
|- id="2001 UW240" bgcolor=#d6d6d6
| 0 ||  || MBA-O || 16.2 || 3.2 km || multiple || 2001–2020 || 27 Apr 2020 || 60 || align=left | Disc.: SpacewatchAdded on 22 July 2020 || 
|- id="2001 UY240" bgcolor=#fefefe
| 1 ||  || MBA-I || 19.0 || data-sort-value="0.47" | 470 m || multiple || 2001–2018 || 11 Aug 2018 || 35 || align=left | Disc.: NEATAdded on 19 October 2020 || 
|- id="2001 UZ240" bgcolor=#E9E9E9
| 0 ||  || MBA-M || 17.6 || 1.7 km || multiple || 2001–2020 || 16 Nov 2020 || 53 || align=left | Disc.: SDSSAdded on 19 October 2020 || 
|- id="2001 UA241" bgcolor=#fefefe
| 1 ||  || MBA-I || 18.96 || data-sort-value="0.48" | 480 m || multiple || 2001–2020 || 13 Sep 2020 || 31 || align=left | Disc.: SpacewatchAdded on 19 October 2020 || 
|- id="2001 UB241" bgcolor=#fefefe
| 0 ||  || MBA-I || 19.0 || data-sort-value="0.47" | 470 m || multiple || 2001–2020 || 06 Dec 2020 || 59 || align=left | Disc.: SDSSAdded on 17 January 2021 || 
|- id="2001 UC241" bgcolor=#E9E9E9
| 0 ||  || MBA-M || 17.4 || 1.8 km || multiple || 2001–2021 || 18 Jan 2021 || 62 || align=left | Disc.: SDSSAdded on 17 January 2021 || 
|- id="2001 UD241" bgcolor=#fefefe
| 0 ||  || MBA-I || 18.9 || data-sort-value="0.49" | 490 m || multiple || 2001–2020 || 06 Dec 2020 || 55 || align=left | Disc.: SDSSAdded on 17 January 2021 || 
|- id="2001 UE241" bgcolor=#E9E9E9
| 4 ||  || MBA-M || 18.0 || data-sort-value="0.75" | 750 m || multiple || 2001–2019 || 09 Feb 2019 || 22 || align=left | Disc.: ADASAdded on 17 January 2021 || 
|- id="2001 UF241" bgcolor=#d6d6d6
| 0 ||  || MBA-O || 17.2 || 2.0 km || multiple || 2001–2021 || 08 May 2021 || 37 || align=left | Disc.: SDSSAdded on 21 August 2021Alt.: 2012 UU110 || 
|- id="2001 UG241" bgcolor=#E9E9E9
| 2 ||  || MBA-M || 18.4 || data-sort-value="0.62" | 620 m || multiple || 2001–2019 || 28 Jan 2019 || 15 || align=left | Disc.: NEATAdded on 21 August 2021 || 
|- id="2001 UH241" bgcolor=#fefefe
| 1 ||  || MBA-I || 19.71 || data-sort-value="0.34" | 340 m || multiple || 2001–2021 || 26 Oct 2021 || 50 || align=left | Disc.: SpacewatchAdded on 21 August 2021 || 
|- id="2001 UJ241" bgcolor=#E9E9E9
| 0 ||  || MBA-M || 18.34 || data-sort-value="0.64" | 640 m || multiple || 2001–2021 || 13 Jun 2021 || 30 || align=left | Disc.: NEATAdded on 5 November 2021 || 
|}
back to top

References 
 

Lists of unnumbered minor planets